= Harrow, London =

Town in Greater London, England

Coordinates: 51.5836°N 0.3464°W

Harrow
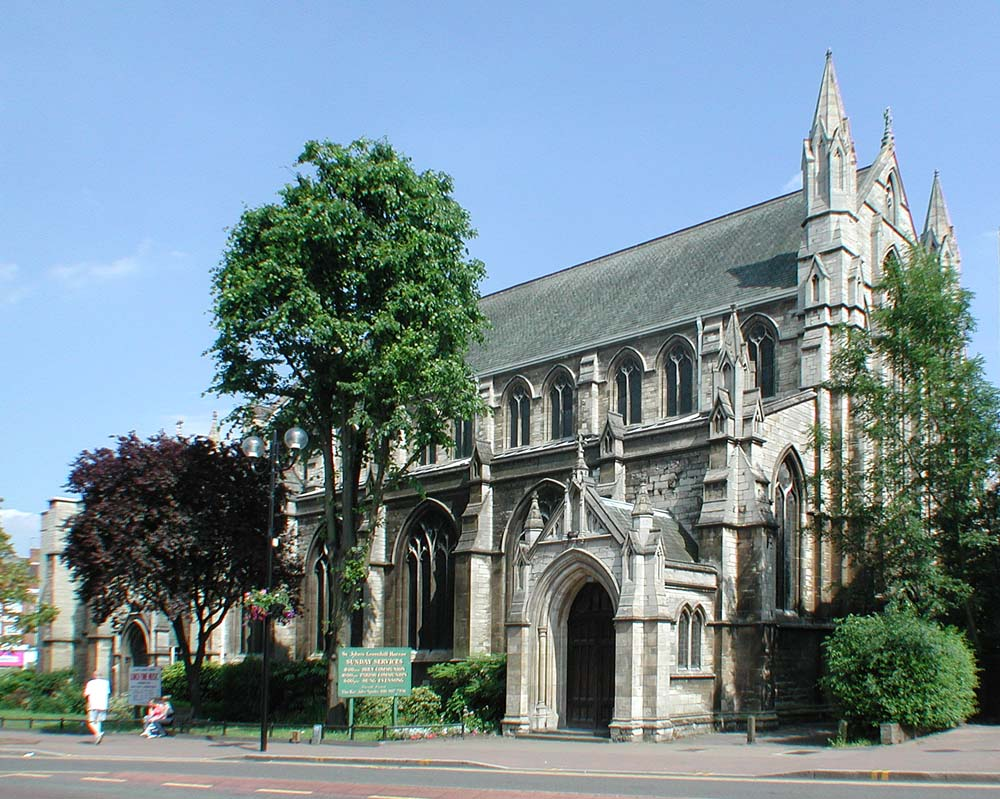
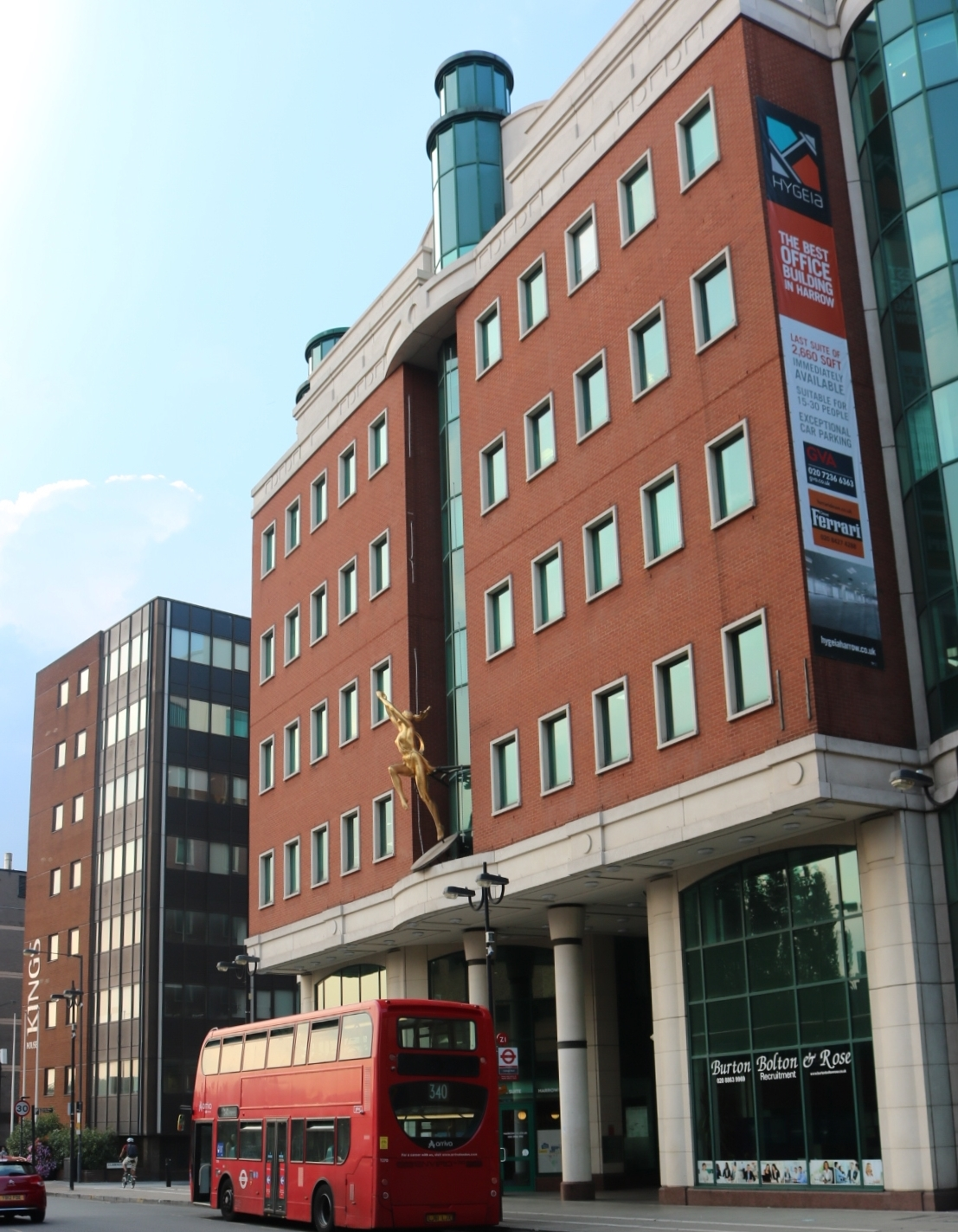
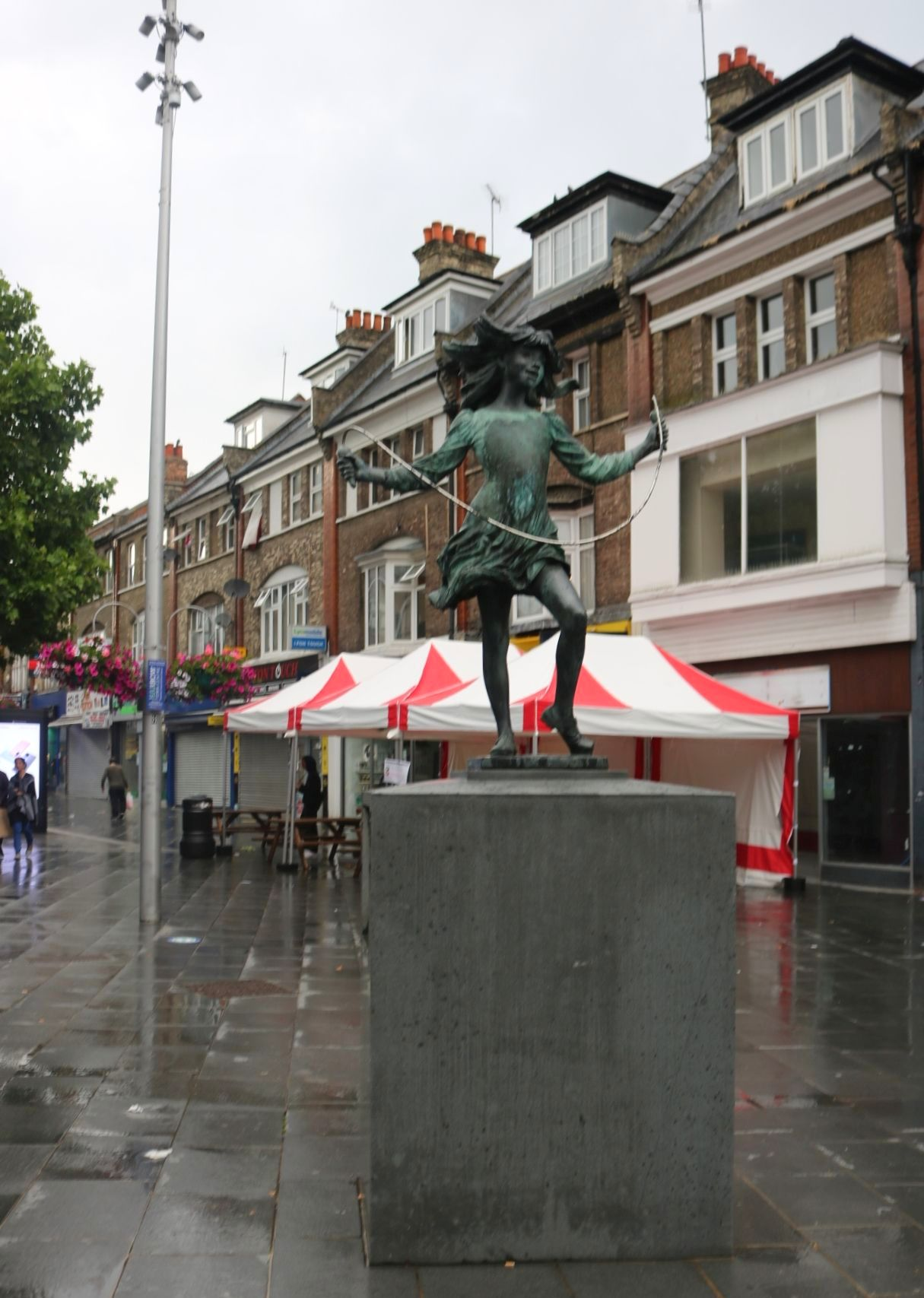
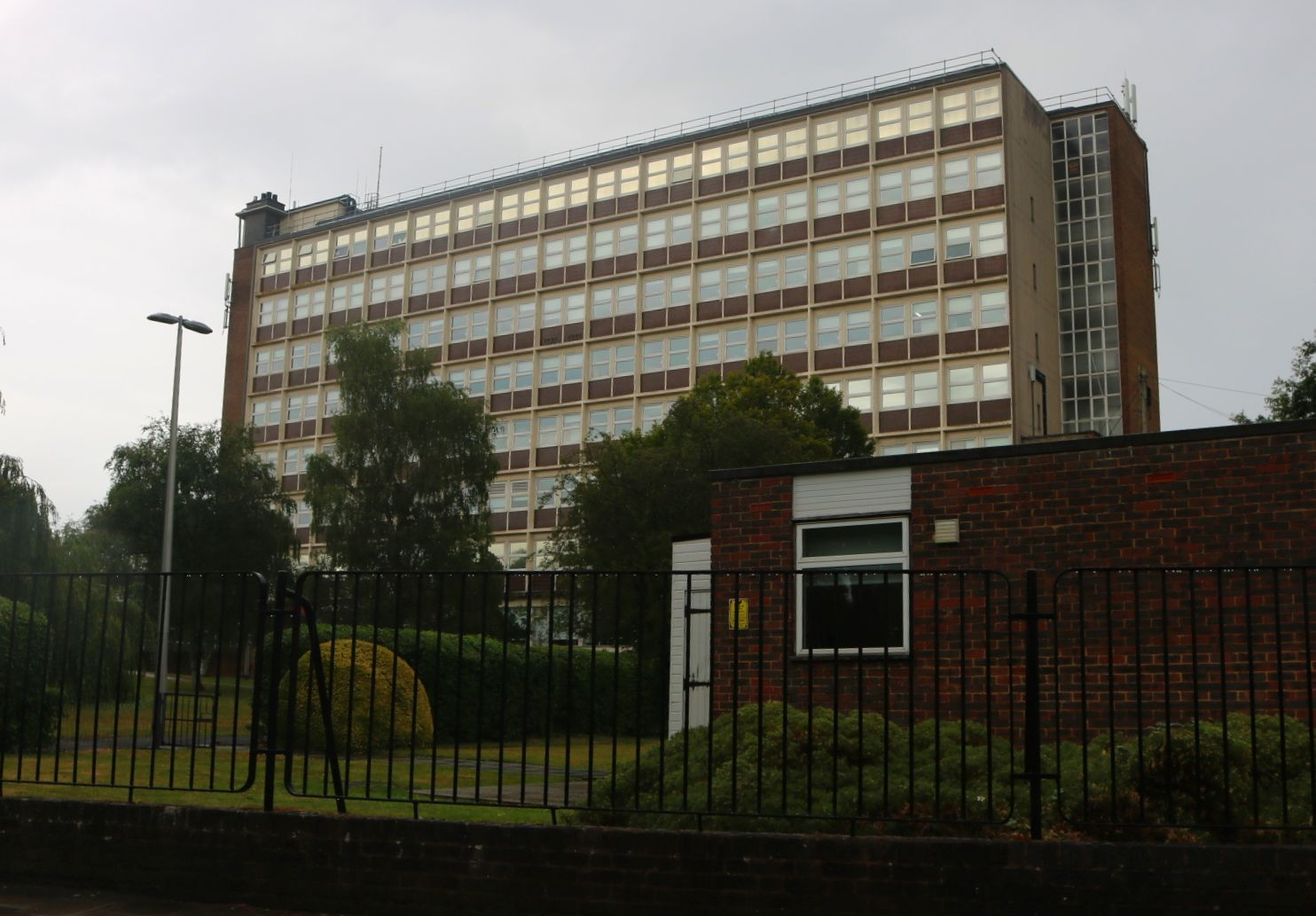
- Clockwise from top: St. John the Baptist C of E Church, Greenhill; Skipping Katie statue; University of Westminster; Hygeia Building and King's House

- Location within Greater London
- Population: 149,246 (2011 Census)
- Demonym: Harrovian
- OS grid reference: TQ145885
  - Charing Cross: 11 mi (18 km) ESE
- London borough: Harrow
- Ceremonial county: Greater London
- Region: London
- Country: England
- Sovereign state: United Kingdom
- Post town: HARROW
- Postcode district: HA1, HA2, HA3
- Dialling code: 020
- Police: Metropolitan
- Fire: London
- Ambulance: London
- UK Parliament: Harrow East Harrow West Ruislip, Northwood and Pinner
- London Assembly: Brent and Harrow

Harrow (/ˈhæroʊ/) is a town in Greater London, England, and serves as the principal settlement of the London Borough of Harrow. The eastern part of the town, by Northwick Park Hospital, crosses the London Borough of Brent border. Harrow lies about 9.5 miles (15.3 km) north-west of Charing Cross and 5.4 miles (8.7 km) south of Watford. In 2022, the town and localities had an estimated population of 117,651, whereas the wider borough (which also contains Pinner and Stanmore) had a population of 261,185.

The original settlement was at Harrow on the Hill, atop the 408 feet (124 m) Harrow Hill. The modern town centre of Harrow developed at the foot of the hill, in an area historically called Greenhill, following the opening of Harrow-on-the-Hill station on the Metropolitan Railway in 1880. Harrow became the unofficial "capital" of the Metroland suburbia in the early 20th century. Harrow & Wealdstone station on the West Coast Main Line had opened in 1837, but was more distant from Harrow, lying 1.5 miles (2.4 km) north of the hill. Workers were drawn to the area by the opening of several factories in Wealdstone; Harrow was the base of the large Kodak factory, used for the manufacture of photographic materials and R&D, which was in operation for more than a century.

Historically in the hundred of Gore in the county of Middlesex, Harrow became part of Greater London in 1965. Today, the historic area is distinguished as Harrow on the Hill and is a conservation area with listed buildings of Georgian architecture and home to Harrow School, one of the seven major boys' boarding schools in England as defined by the Public Schools Act 1868. The modern-day town meanwhile is an established commercial centre of outer north-west London and houses a campus of the University of Westminster.

== Etymology ==
Harrow's name comes from Old English hearg, '(heathen) temple', which was probably on the hill of Harrow, where St. Mary's Church now stands. The name has been studied in detail by Keith Briggs.

The original Greenhill hamlet derived its name from either an unidentified local green hill, or was imported from a manorial surname. It was not recorded in the Domesday Book but was mentioned as early as 1334 as Grenehulle. In addition, one or more families bearing the Greenhulle or Greenhill surname lived there from at least 1247, and are likely to have taken their name from this location. The name Greenhill survives and the local council has continued the name by using it for Greenhill Way, a road which by-passes the mainly-pedestrianised and modernised shopping area based around College Road and St Anns Road. The name is also still used for the local electoral ward.

It is possible that Greenhill went by an even older name, Norbury, c.1300, but the hamlet of Norbury has not been identified with certainty. The name may have been correspondent to Sudbury, being north of what was then Harrow Hill.

== History ==
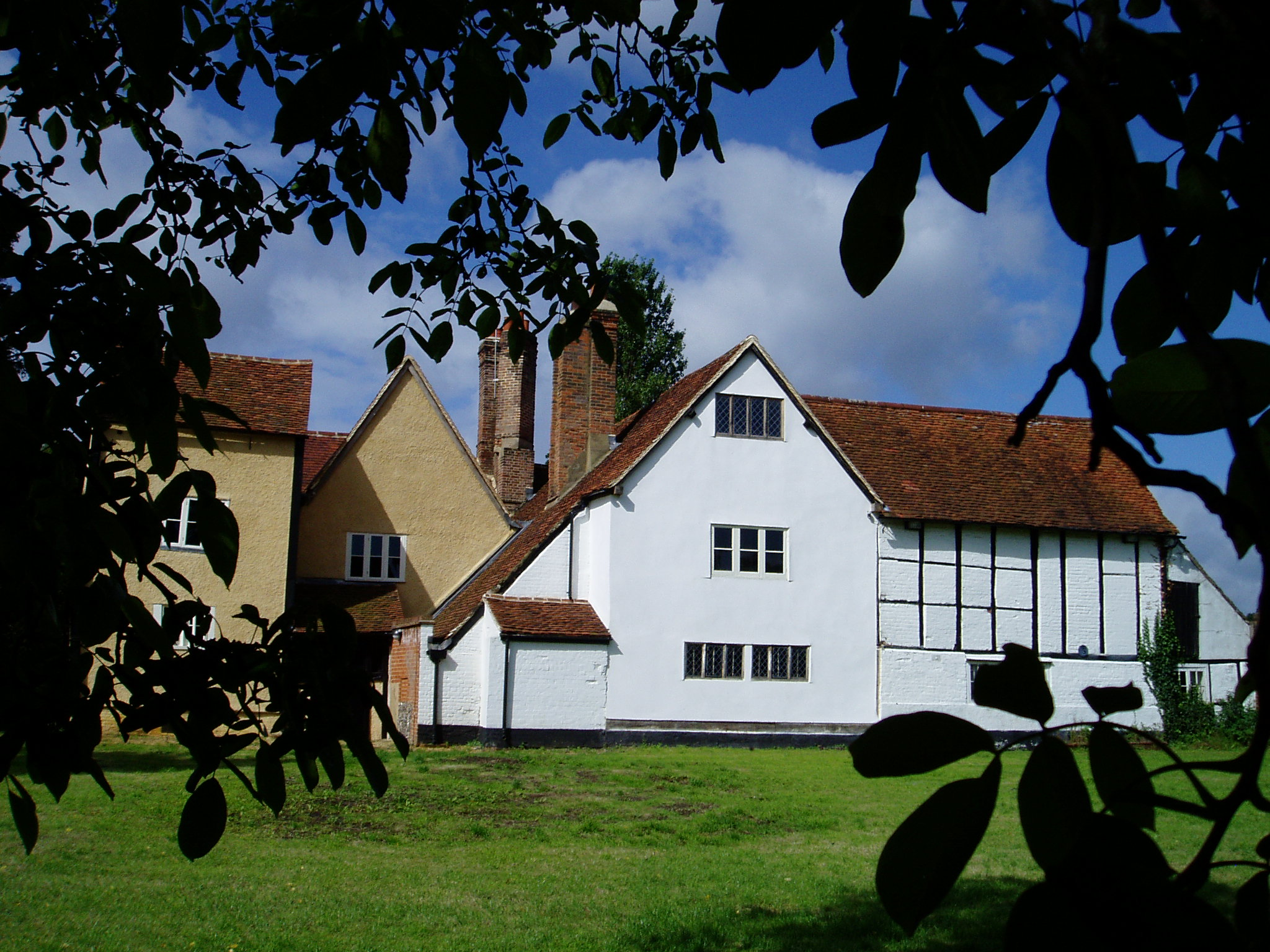
Grade I listed Headstone Manor

The modern town centre of Harrow was formerly known as Greenhill, and was a small hamlet of farms at the foot of Harrow Hill. For almost a millennium, the centre of Harrow was atop the hill, but this began to change during the 19th century. Circa 1852, the village had 8 houses, 17 cottages, and one inn, with 141 people. This area was part of the hundred of Gore, in the historic county of Middlesex. In 1850 a local board district was established for the central part of the ancient parish of Harrow on the Hill, including the old village and the adjoining hamlets of Greenhill, Roxeth, and Sudbury. One of the oldest surviving buildings, in what is today Harrow, is the Grade I listed Headstone Manor from the 14th century.

=== Urban development ===
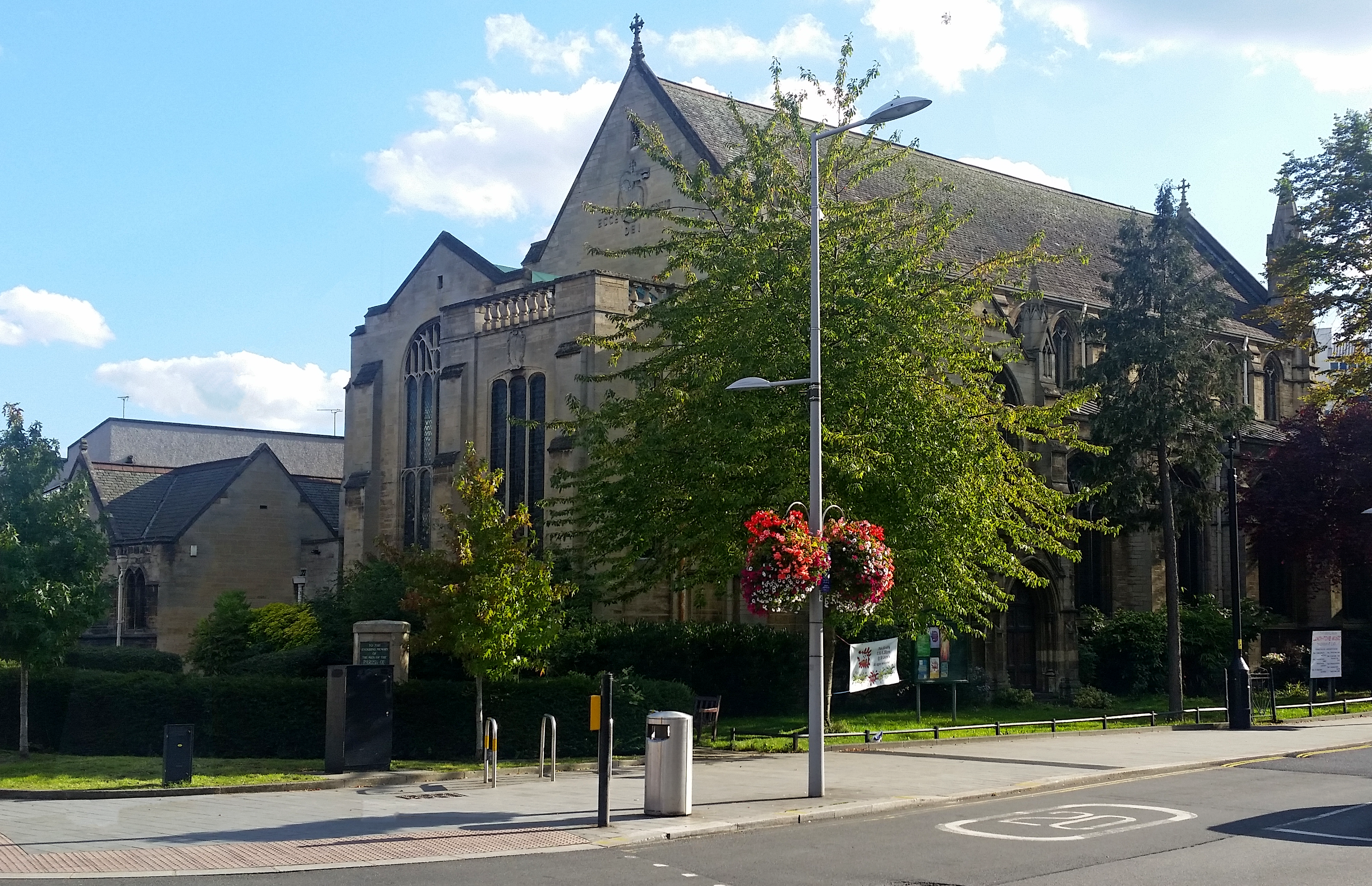
Grade II listed St John's Greenhill church originally served the hamlet of Greenhill - parts of the original building were demolished in 1905; today it is located in town on Sheepcote Road

By 1865, a series of roads had been built in Greenhill, including College, Roxborough, Kymberley, Headstone, Clarendon, Byron and St Anns - but few houses. A parish church, St John's Church, was built in 1866 on a farm and Greenhill subsequently became a separate ecclesiastical parish in 1896. The church building has been Grade II listed since 1994. The Metropolitan Railway connection dates from 1880 with the building of Harrow-on-the-Hill station, which led to a housebuilding boom and a population of 4,892 by 1902. Developments westward along the railway in the Headstone and Pinner as well as Roxborough and Wealdstone engulfed Greenhill with new developments, and soon enough there was nothing left of the original village.

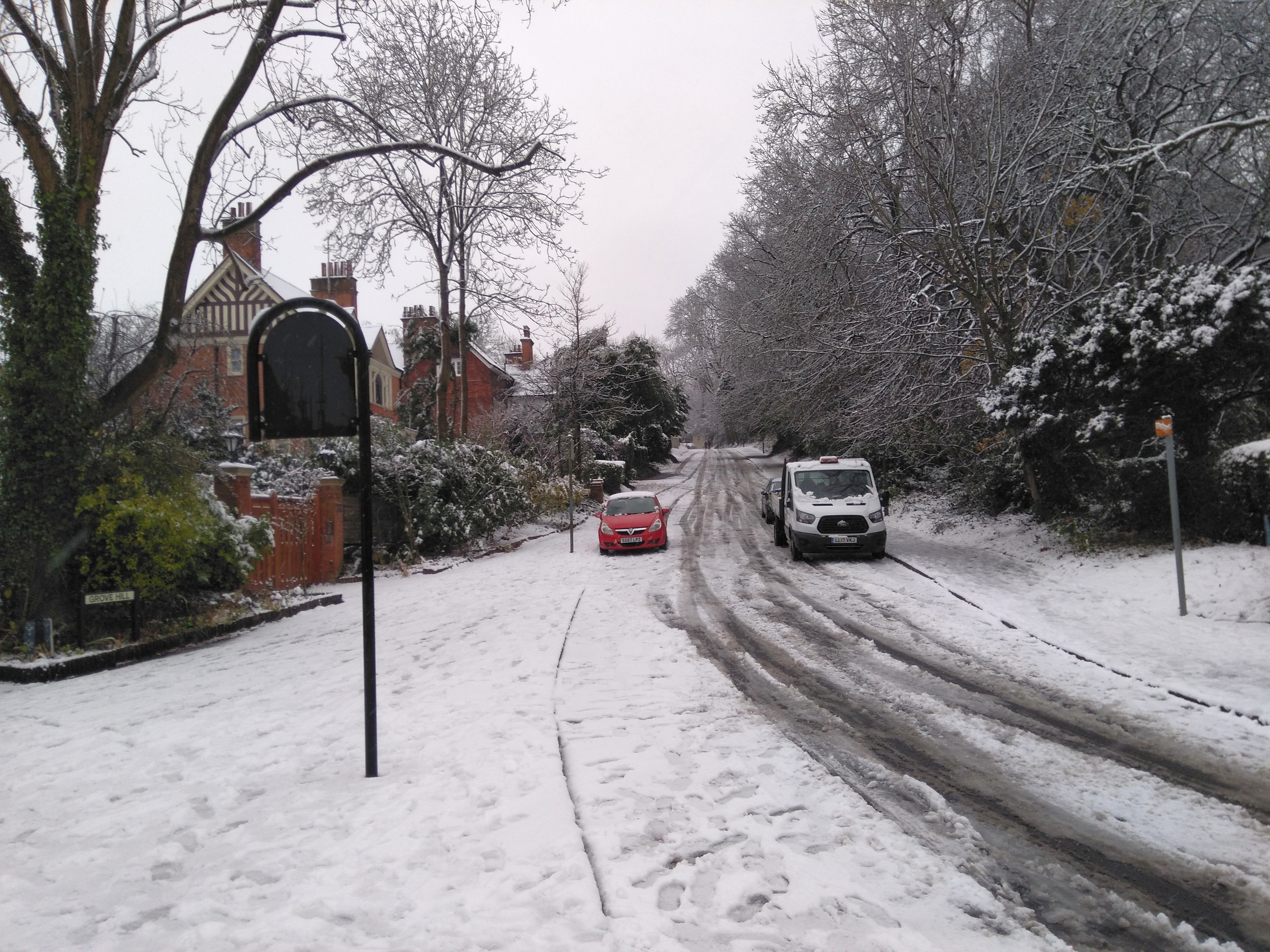
Looking towards Grove Hill - behind the photographer was the scene of the 1899 car accident

In 1899, the junction of Grove Hill and Lowlands Road is said to have been the scene of Britain's first fatal car accident. There is a plaque to commemorate this at the top of Grove Hill where it meets the High Street and Peterborough Hill.

In Greenhill, there was a workmen's club from the 1860s and a public hall, Victoria Hall, by 1888.

The Local Government Act 1894 converted local board districts such as Harrow on the Hill into urban districts. The new town centre, which had grown up around the station, became known simply as Harrow to distinguish it from the original hilltop village. The name of the urban district, which contained both places, remained Harrow on the Hill until 1934 when the district was enlarged and renamed just Harrow. The Harrow Urban District was incorporated to become a municipal borough in 1954, with the same area becoming the London Borough of Harrow on being transferred from Middlesex to Greater London in 1965.

Harrow contributed to the growing photographic industry in the UK; a large industrial premises was built in 1890 by the American Eastman Kodak company in Wealdstone, and by 1965 there were over 100 buildings on a 55-acre site at Kodak Harrow, employing 5,500 people, including a research centre. This facility operated for 125 years. The long chimney has been a landmark in Harrow ever since.

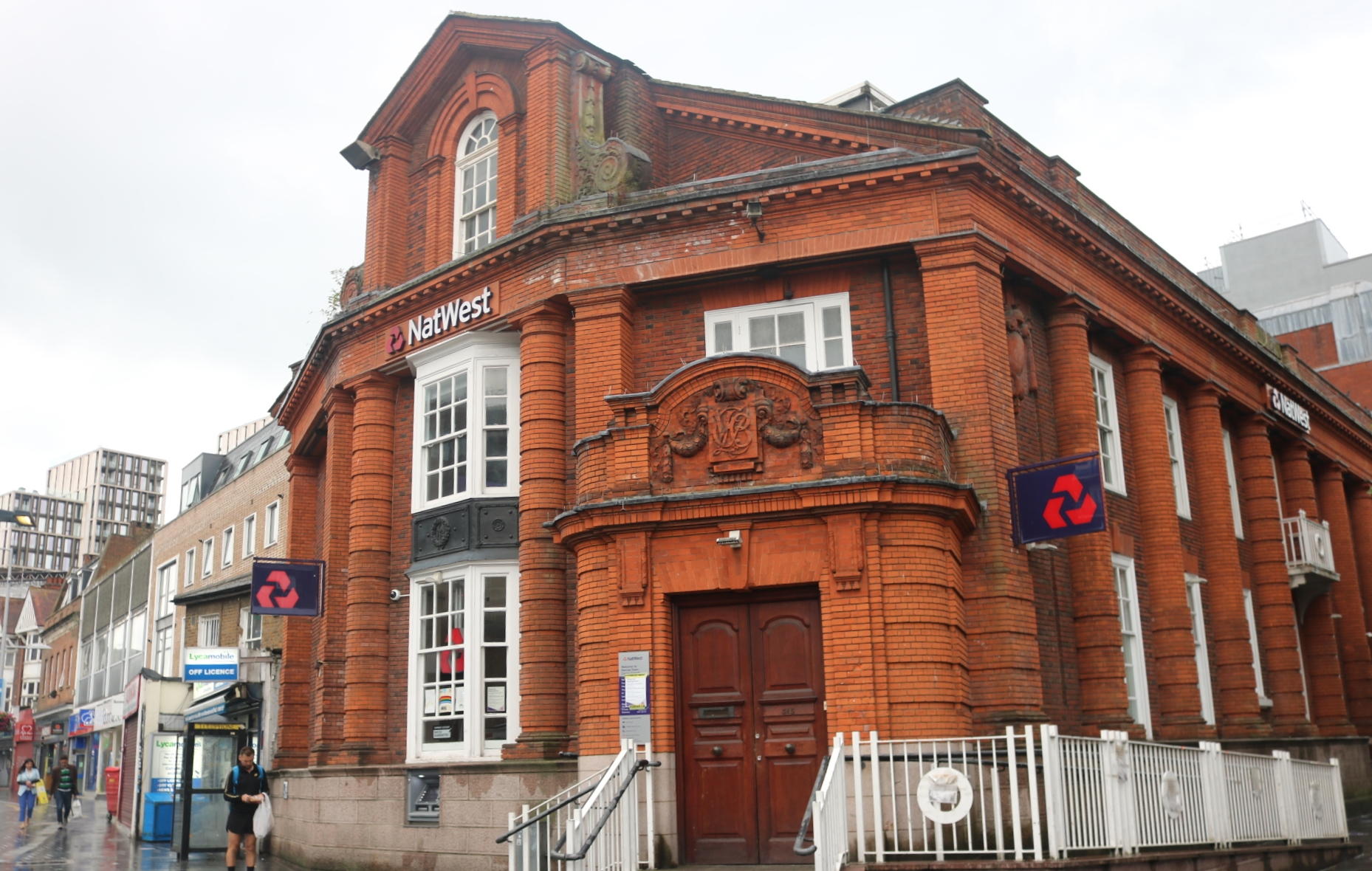
315 Station Road, Grade II listed building designed by Sir Banister Fletcher in 1915, which houses a NatWest bank today

In 1914, a major department store named Sopers opened on Station Road. The site became a Debenhams store; it closed in May 2021 after the collapse of the Debenham's chain. Its facade dated from the 1960s.

During the inter-war period Harrow had grown into a suburb. Almost two-thirds of housing stock in the present day Borough of Harrow dates back to the interwar period.

==== Railway accidents ====
The modern town of Harrow and much of the borough overall has been defined historically by the growth of the railways, as Harrow expanded and saw housing developments as a result of the building of the Metropolitan Railway into what was, in early Victorian times, the rural areas to the north-west of London. The borough now has many railway stations.

Harrow has been the location of several serious train accidents. On 7 August 1838, Thomas Port died from injuries received in a train accident near Harrow. His gravestone in the parish churchyard of St Mary's, Harrow-on-the-Hill, states: "To the memory of Thomas Port, son of John Port of Burton-upon-Trent in the County of Stafford, Hat Manufacturer, who near this town had both legs severed from his body by the railway train. With great fortitude, he bore a second amputation by the surgeons and died from loss of blood, August 7th 1838, aged 33 years." On 26 November 1870, two trains collided at Harrow & Wealdstone station, killing 9 and injuring 44. On 8 October 1952, three trains collided at Harrow & Wealdstone station, killing 112 people. Of the dead, 64 were railway employees on their way to work. This is the greatest loss of life in any United Kingdom railway accident in peacetime.

=== Battle of Britain ===
Although The Blitz is generally claimed to have started on 7 September 1940, many sources state that one of the earliest bombing raid from the Luftwaffe occurred in Harrow and Wealdstone on 22 August 1940. It caused damage to cinemas, houses and a bank, but with no fatalities. Although Harrow was then in Middlesex, it was classed as a London area by the civil defence as it came under the jurisdiction of the Metropolitan Police. The very first air raid on the present day London area is believed to be the accidental bombing of Croydon Airport on 15 August 1940, which was then in Surrey.

=== Post-war ===
The town was part of the Harrow Urban District, a district council within the county of Middlesex, from 1934 until 1965, which also included parts of Edgware, Hendon, Wembley and Pinner. The London Borough of Harrow was formed in 1965 as the only London borough unaffected by boundary changes.

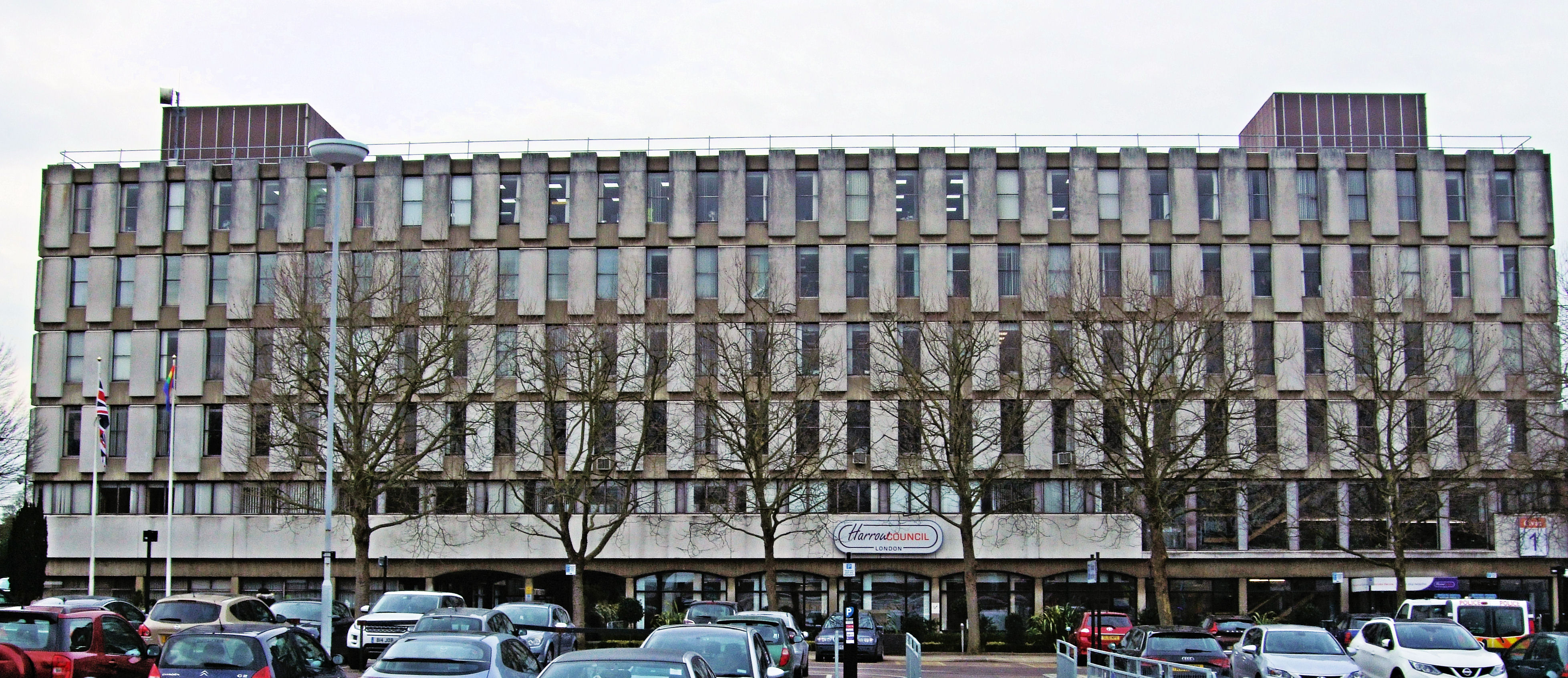
Harrow Civic Centre, built in 1972

By the 1950s, Harrow was described as the "capital city of Metro-land". The borough's council Civic Centre building complex was built in 1970–1972, opened 6 May 1973, on Station Road in Wealdstone. Six storeys high and designed by architect Eric Broughton, the building is considered "outdated and costly" in 2018 and was expected to be imminently redeveloped. Throughout the 1960s and 1970s, many new office blocks were built in the town, especially in Lyon Road and the western end of College Road.

In 1974, the Kodak Mural designed by Pentagram was completed on the first floor of the recently opened Civic Centre. It contains almost one thousand photographic tiles representing Harrow and designed to commemorate the town and borough's links with Kodak.

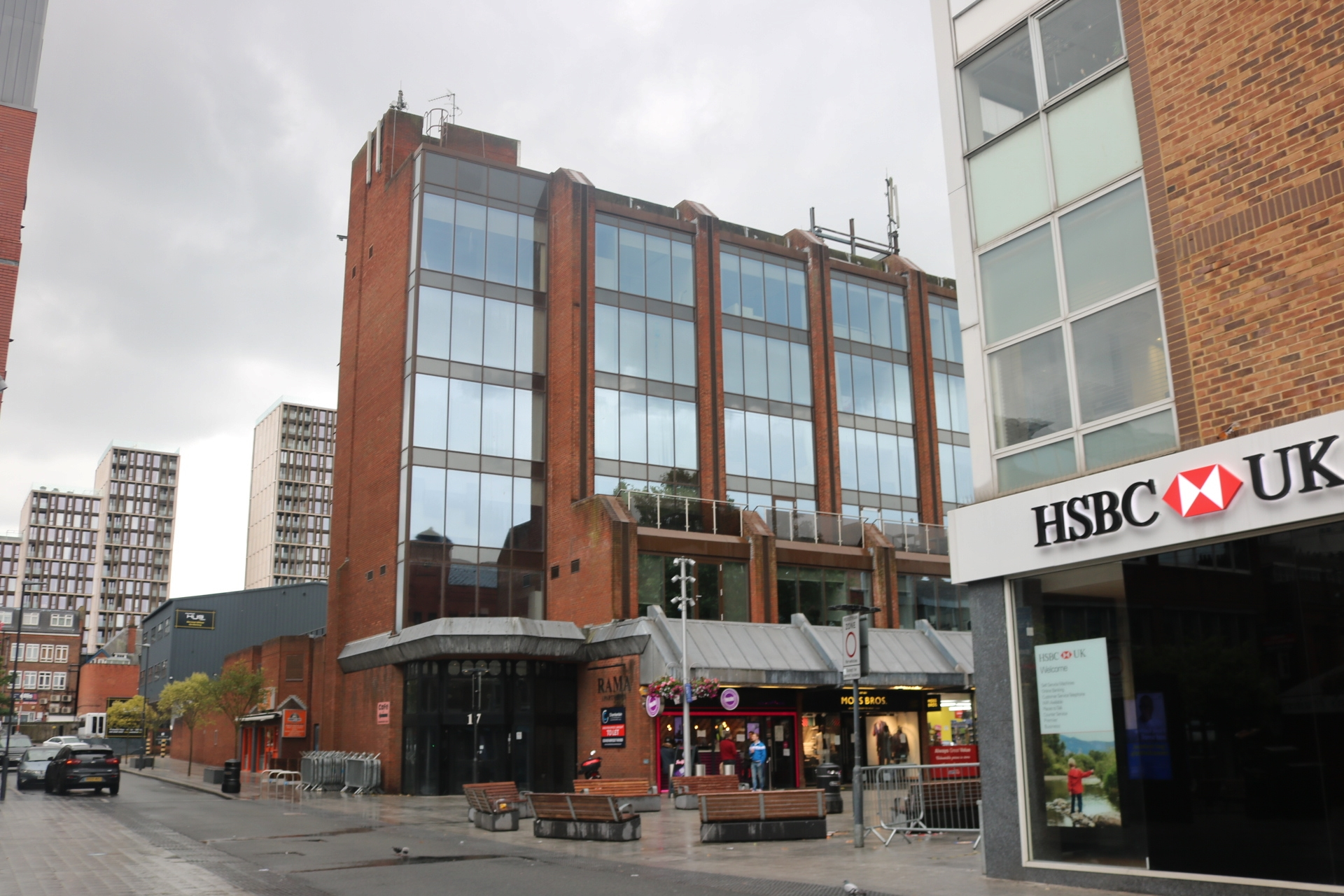
Town centre pedestrianised in the 1980s (Havelock Place)

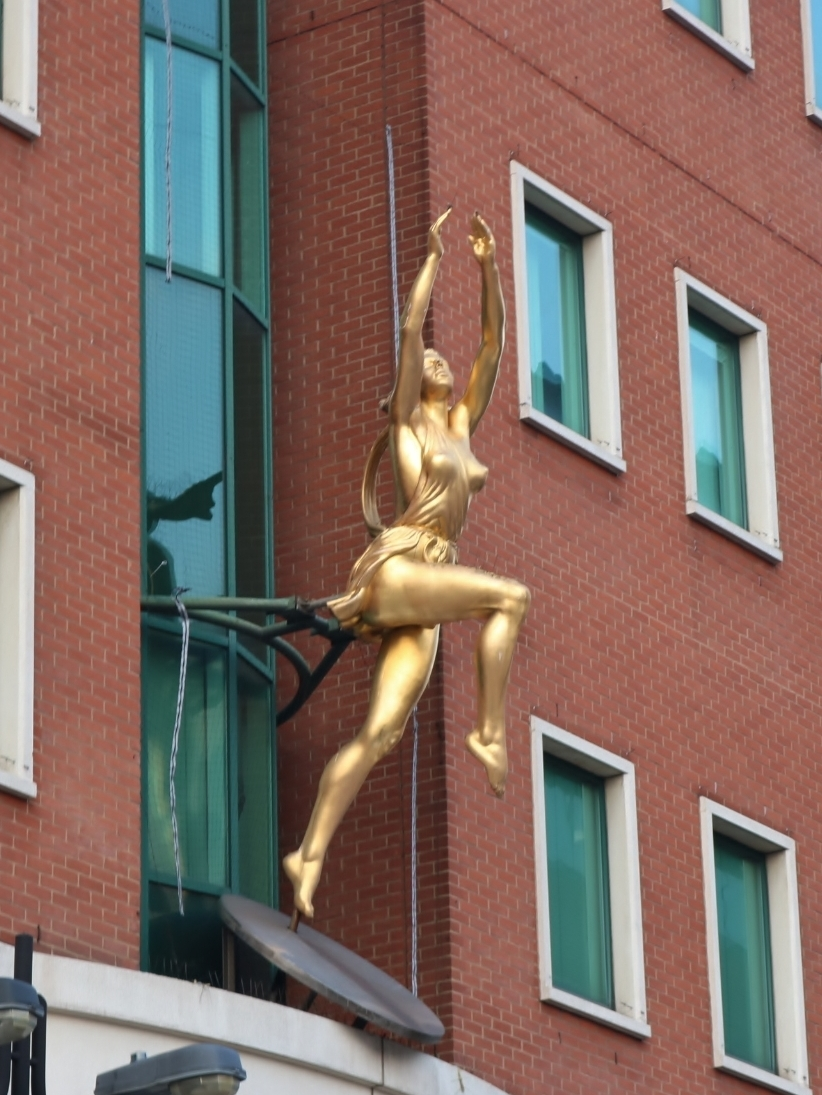
Statue of Hygeia on the Hygeia Building

The town underwent regeneration in the 1980s with the building of a bus station in College Road and the pedestrianisation of St Anns Road. A statue called "Skipping Katie" was unveiled by the local council in May 1987 to celebrate the completion of the pedestrianisation. The landmark was designed by James Butler inspired by watching his daughter skip. A plaque on Katie was unveiled in 2004 by Queen Elizabeth II and the Duke of Edinburgh to mark the 50th anniversary of the London Borough of Harrow.

In the autumn of 1987, Diana, Princess of Wales visited Harrow, where she officially opened the new St Anns shopping centre amid a large crowd of locals. Located opposite the central train station on College Road, the centre was built on demolished buildings including Heathfield School for Girls, which moved away to Pinner in 1982.

Nearby St Anns shopping centre, another indoor retail outlet was built which was opened as St George's Shopping and Leisure Centre on St George's Day in 1996. The town's Woolworths store on Station Road closed and was replaced by a new branch inside St George's. Other landmarks built during the decade include the Hygeia building in 1991, which has an erected golden coloured sculpture of Roman goddess Hygeia facing the bus station. Furthermore, in 1991, Lower Mead stadium on Station Road, the home of Wealdstone F.C., was sold to Tesco and demolished. In its place a new large Tesco superstore was built.

=== 21st century ===
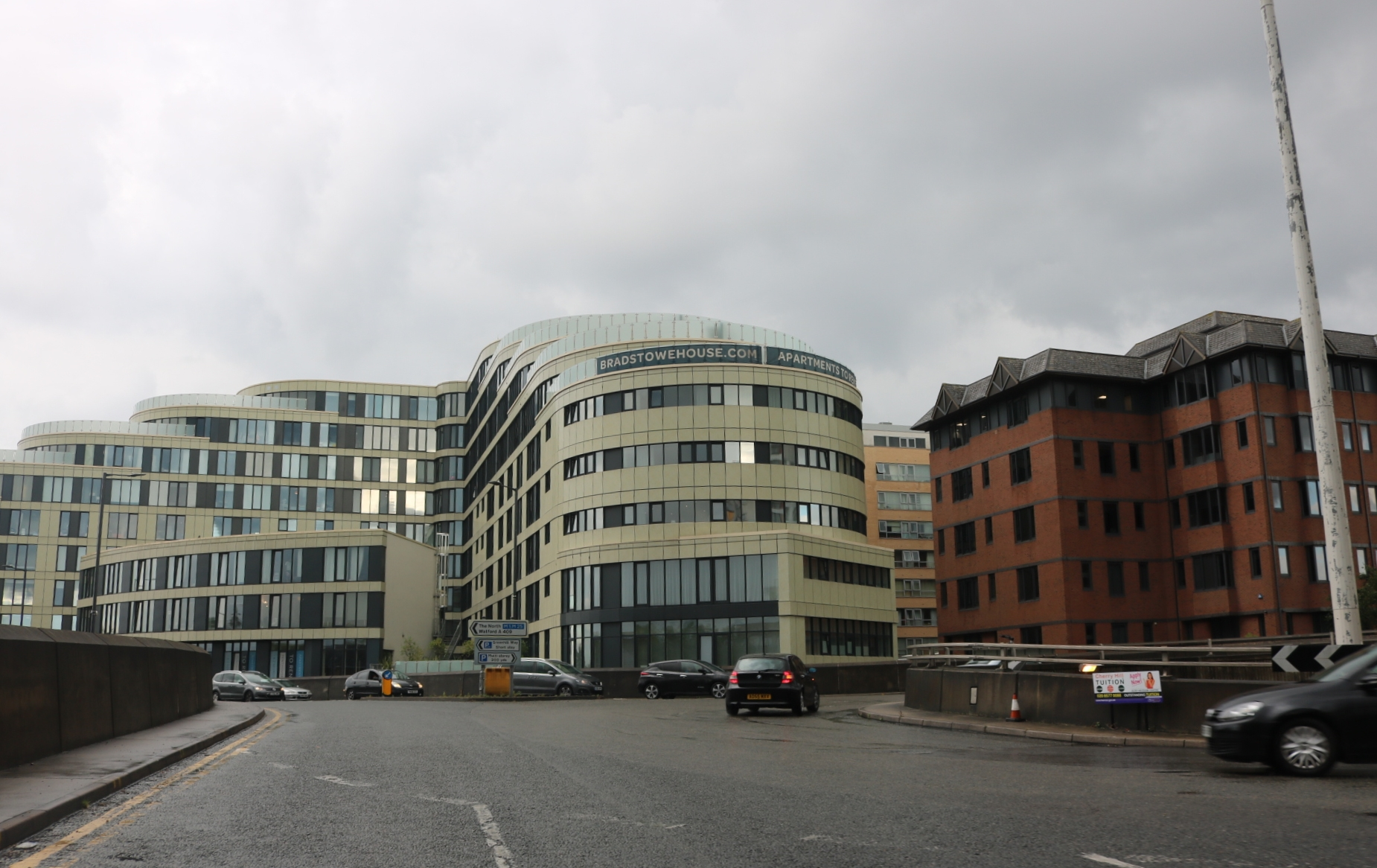
Bradstowe House, one of the 21st century developments

The town centre has undergone a new wave of redevelopment. In 2011, the one-way single lane section of Station Road was widened to allow two-way bus traffic. The 11 storey luxury apartments of Bradstowe House were completed in 2016 after long delays. Former office buildings on Lyon Road (including Coal House, once belonging to the National Coal Board) have been regenerated into new mixed use buildings in the 2010s, whereas on Pinner Road behind St George's centre a new eight storey development called Trident Point was built which includes a Morrisons supermarket opened in 2013. The former post-office sorting building on College Road, next to the train station, remained vacant for some years until plans for a 19-storey skyscraper were approved by the council in 2015. The development, called Harrow Square, was partly completed with 318 apartments across four buildings in 2018. It includes a bottom floor 1,450 square metres (15,600 sq ft) library still under construction which will replace the current Gayton Library on St John's Road. The building next to it, formerly First National House, has been refurbished into luxury apartments called The Hub.

The borough received a £1 million grant from the Mayor of London that will go towards a new public square and a "pop-up test eatery" at the site of the former Cumberland Hotel on Lyon Road, expected to be completed by 2020. The 1930s art deco facade of the Safari Cinema, which has been hidden since the 1960s, is set to be restored from 2020. The council aims to invest over a billion pounds in the town centres of Harrow and Wealdstone and the Station Road corridor in between.

== Geography ==
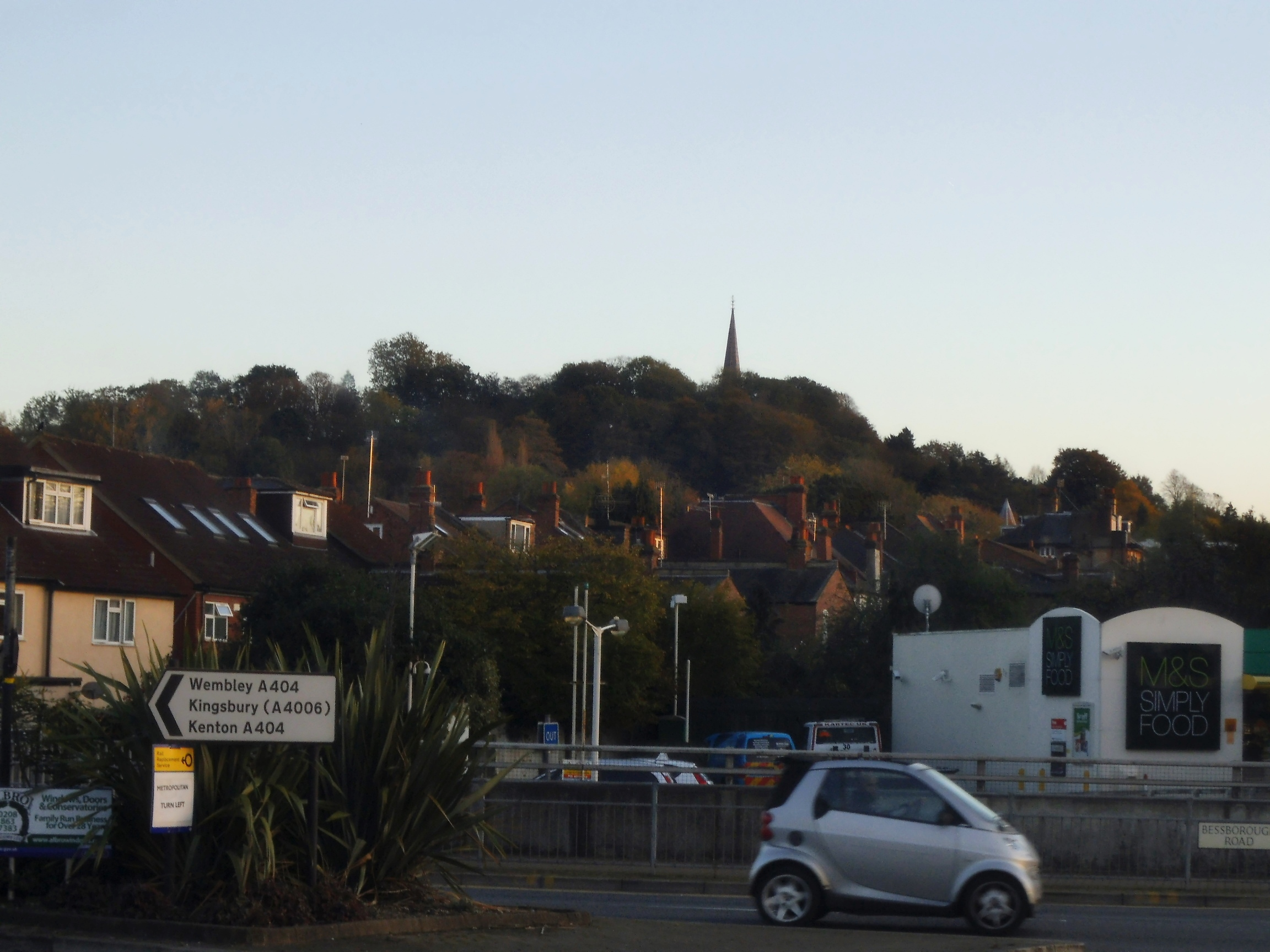
View of Harrow Hill and the spire of St Mary's Church from Bessborough Road, Harrow

The borough of Harrow has a leafy, suburban character, much of which is a legacy of it being at the centre of the Metroland developments of the early 20th century.

The town centre is about 220 feet (67 m) above sea level, almost 200 feet (61 m) below the top of Harrow Hill, which is an outlying knoll. The hill is half a mile south of the town centre, and the settlement contains historic architecture and has a village atmosphere. The steep climb towards the hill is clearly visible from Lowlands Road. Other parts of Harrow are not as affluent but are still mostly leafy, particularly the northern part called Harrow Weald. The rural northern slopes of Harrow, around Harrow Weald Common, are part of the Green Belt and contain a conservation area and a Site of Special Scientific Interest (SSSI) adjacent to another SSSI called Bentley Priory Nature Reserve which comes under Stanmore. The area also has the highest elevation in Harrow, as high as 492 feet (150 m) above sea level.

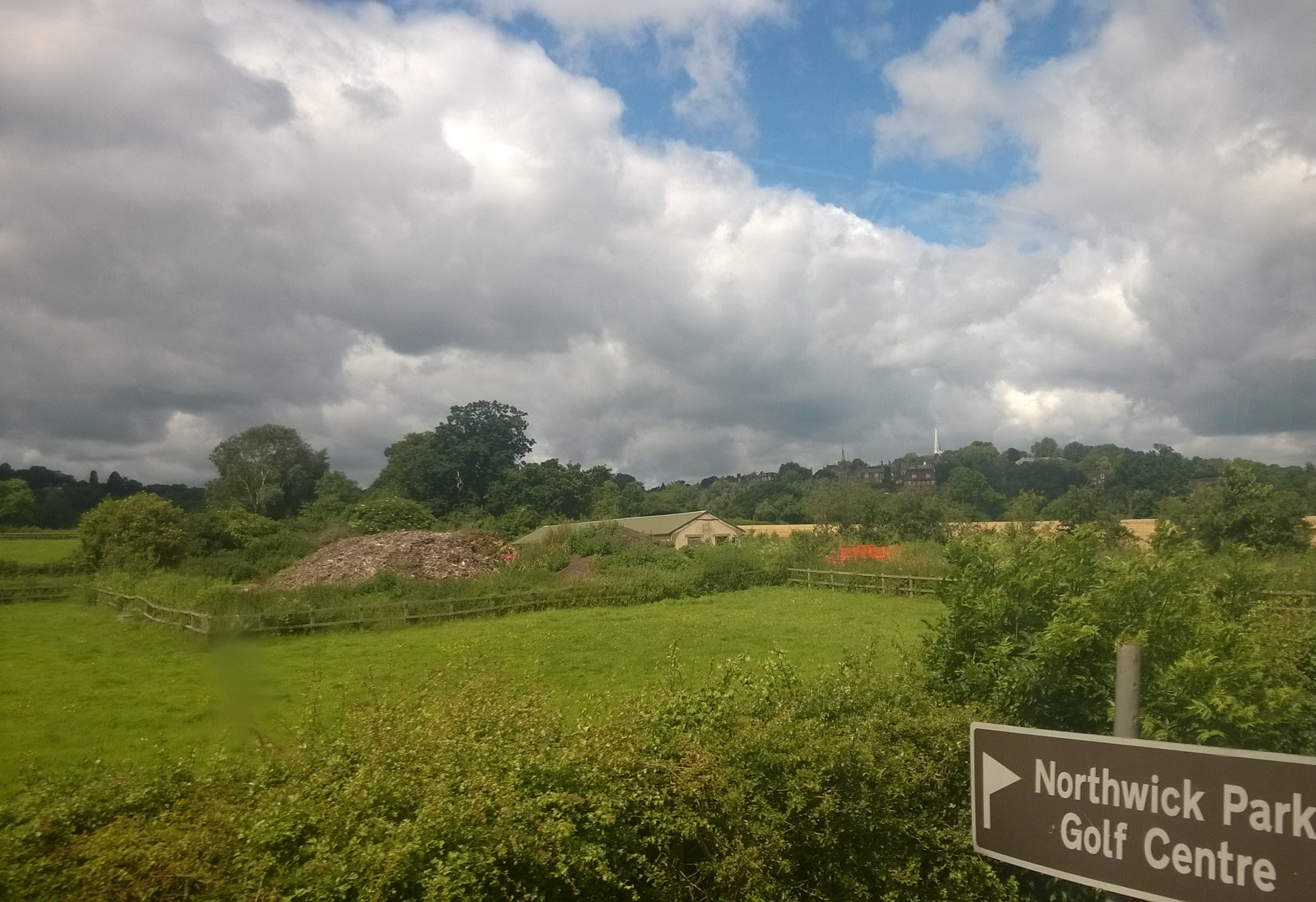
The Harrow School Farm looking north from Watford Road; St Mary's Church spire at the top of Harrow Hill is in the background

There is also agricultural land close by the town, on fields at the eastern side of Harrow on the Hill, on Watford Road. This open farmland is only half a mile away from Harrow's town centre and is adjacent to Northwick Park Hospital and Northwick Park open space. The farm borders Harrow Park and other open spaces and golf courses that are within Harrow on the Hill; other open spaces include: The Grove open space and Harrow Recreation Ground near the town centre; West Harrow Recreation Ground; Kenton Recreation Ground; Alexandra Park in South Harrow; Newton Park in Rayners Lane; Byron Recreation Ground in Wealdstone; and the grounds of Headstone Manor.

Much of Kenton, and before 1716 all of Pinner, were parts of Harrow. Pinner is now a separate district within the borough of Harrow. Harrow Weald is the district north of Wealdstone, and both of these are historically also part of Harrow. It is the principal settlement of the London Borough of Harrow, which also includes the towns of Pinner and Stanmore.

The Harrow postcode area covers the entire borough and stretches into neighbouring boroughs: west into Ruislip and Northwood, and east to Edgware and Wembley. The postcodes for Harrow town itself are HA1, HA2 and HA3.

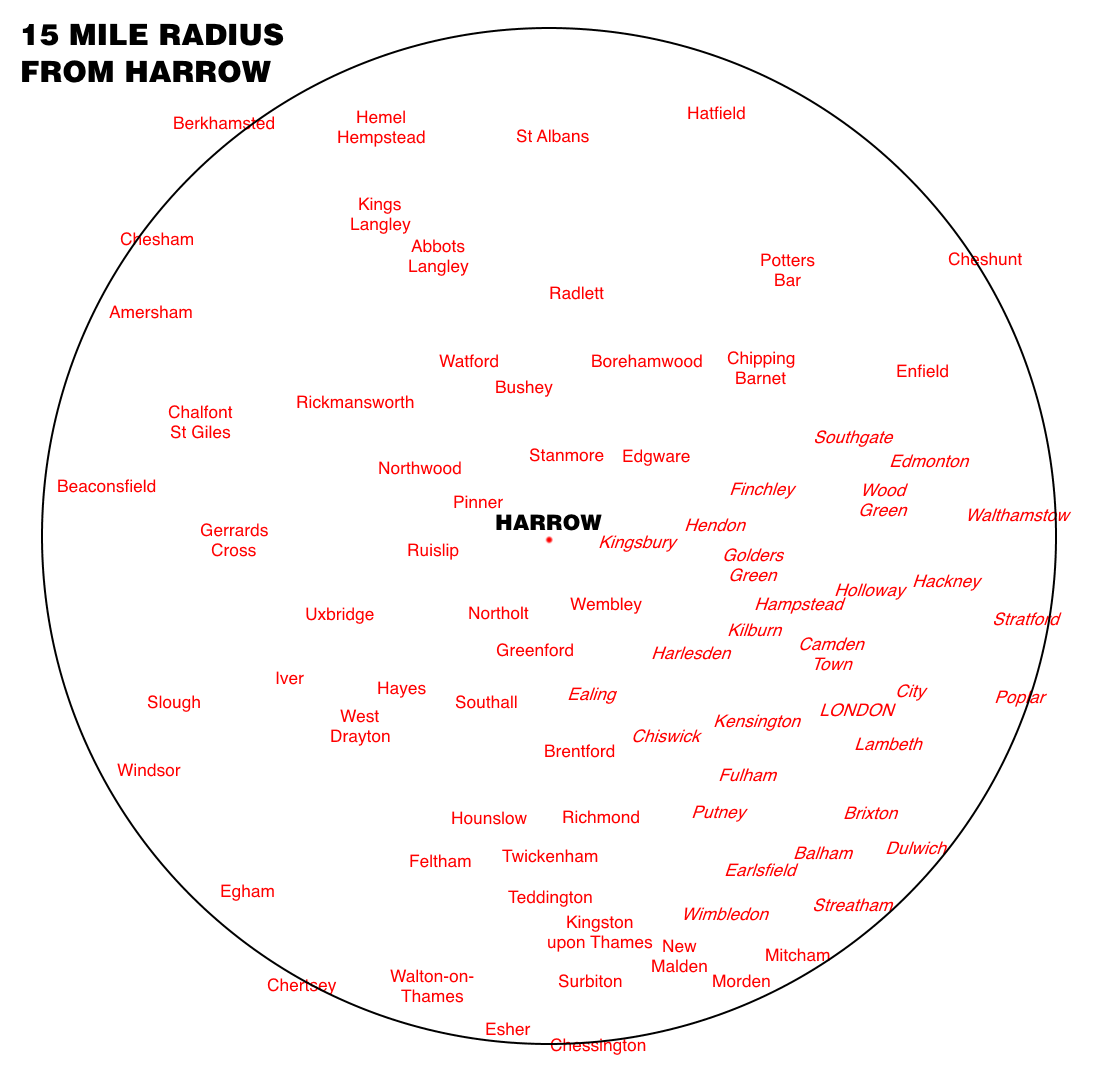
15 mile radius map from Harrow

Harrow is 1.9 miles (3.1 km) from Pinner, 2.7 miles (4.3 km) each from Wembley, Stanmore and Northolt, and 3.6 miles (5.8 km) from Ruislip.

== Economy ==
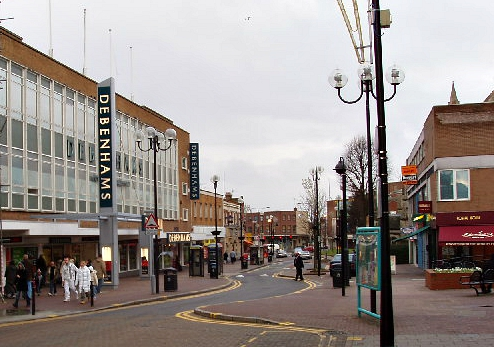
Station Road in Harrow, with the former Debenhams department store on the left hand side (due to become The Landmark from October 2021)

Central Harrow forms a commercial hub in the north-west of Greater London, with many retail outlets and commercial offices, and increasingly residential apartments in more recent regeneration schemes. Harrow is classified as one of 13 metropolitan centres in the London Plan.

The area has two shopping centres, St Anns and St George's, containing chain stores typical of British high streets. There are also parades of shops throughout Station Road and the ascending, traditional College Road, and over 300 metres (980 ft) of a fully pedestranised shopping/café streets roads (north of St Anns). A large Debenhams department store (174,000 square feet (16,200 m^{2}) of floorspace) was on Station Road. After Debenhams was liquidated, the site is to become an independent department store called The Landmark due to open on 14 October 2021. There are also large Morrisons and Tesco superstores. As of 2012, Harrow has 1,128,050 square feet (104,799 m^{2}) of total town centre floorspace, the lowest of London's metropolitan centres.

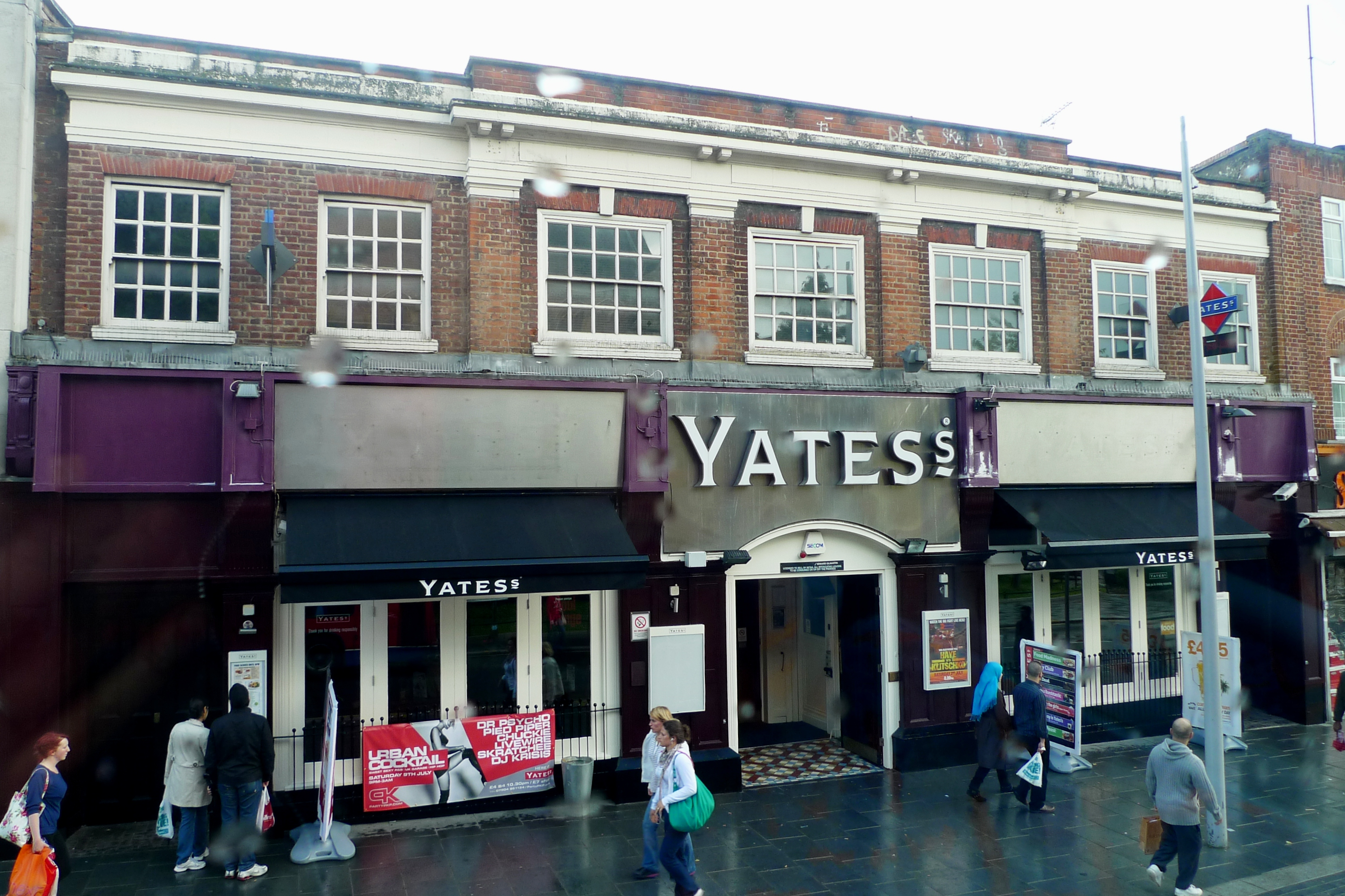
Yates's public house in Station Road (today The George) - it was originally purpose built Woolworths store in 1930, closing in 1996 as the retailer moved to St George's centre

The creation of St George's in 1996, less than a decade after St Anns, gave Harrow a stronger competitive retail standing. On one index, the town centre's league position went from 106th (out of 1,000) to 71st (out of 1,400) from the mid-1980s to mid-1990s. Harrow's competing shopping centres were recognised to be Watford, Uxbridge and Brent Cross Shopping Centre. A 2003 council report showed that Harrow was less competitive as a retail centre by comparison.

In 2015, Harrow ranked 99th in the Hot 100 UK retail locations published by CACI; it was 5th in Greater London, behind Croydon, Kingston upon Thames, Bromley and Enfield Town. In 2018, Harrow was ranked 59th in the nationwide "High Street Investment Ranking" carried out by Knight Frank, and 6th in Greater London beaten by Uxbridge and Richmond.

The Wealdstone district has a strong industrial connection, having been the location for the manufactures Winsor & Newton (artists' materials), Whitefriars Glass, and Kodak.

== Demography ==
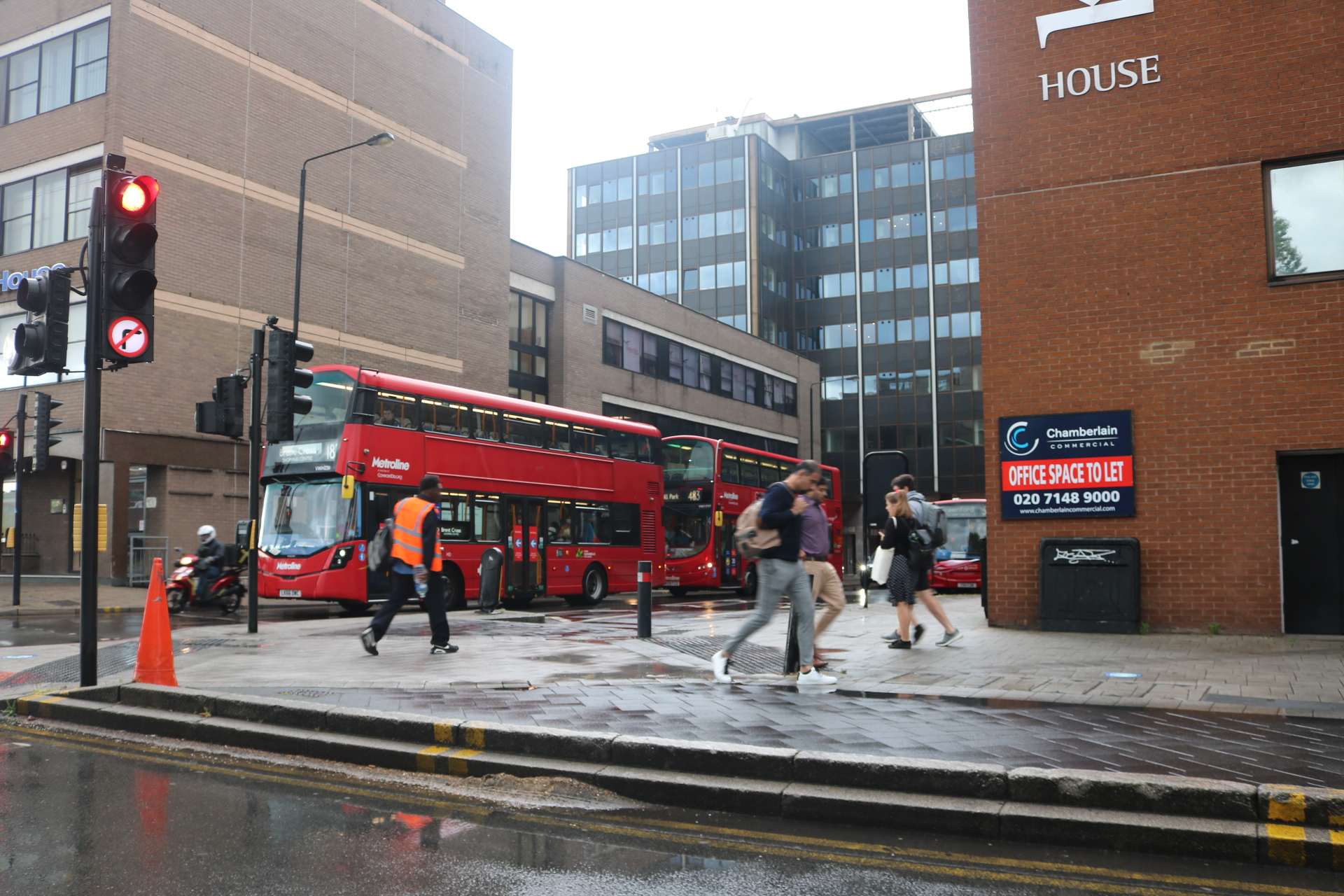
Pedestrians and buses near the bus station

The town includes its localities within the Harrow post town: Harrow on the Hill, Harrow Weald, Headstone, North Harrow, Kenton, Rayners Lane, South Harrow, Wealdstone and West Harrow. The Borough's estimated population on census day 2021 was 261,300.

Harrow Borough's proportion of Jewish, Muslim and Hindu residents is above average. The ethnic minority population includes a large and established Gujarati Indian community, who originally settled in large numbers in the borough after their expulsion from Uganda in 1972.

The highest life expectancy (as of 2009–2013) for females was 89.5 years in Headstone North, and for males was 83.8 years in West Harrow. The lowest expectancies were 82.4 years in Wealdstone and 78.6 years in Greenhill respectively. The median age was highest in Headstone North (40 years) and lowest in Greenhill and Wealdstone (both 33 years). The life expectancies for Harrow are lower than both Pinner and Stanmore in the borough.

According to a 2018 survey by the Office for National Statistics (ONS), the borough of Harrow was the "happiest" in London and scored higher than the English average. Adversely, in another survey by an estate agent in 2019 the borough was found to be the "least friendly" in London.

Average house prices within the borough stood at £479,682 as of 2017.

2011 Census homes %
Ward	Detached	Semi-detached	Terraced	Flats and apartments
Greenhill	4.7%	18.6%	11.5%	65.1%
Harrow on the Hill	18.7%	19.5%	51.5%	
Harrow Weald	17.3%	46.7%	14.8%	21.1%
Headstone North	12.7%	63.2%	7.2%	16.8%
Headstone South	5.4%	36.6%	20.4%	37.5%
Kenton East	4.3%	35.2%	42.8%	17.6%
Kenton West	2.8%	66.6%	19.7%	11.0%
Marlborough	4.8%	30.6%	20.5%	44.1%
Rayners Lane	7.0%	37.9%	38.6%	16.4%
Roxbourne	3.6%	20.7%	37.6%	38.0%
Roxeth	4.4%	49.4%	25.2%	20.9%
Wealdstone	4.5%	28.8%	34.7%	32.1%
West Harrow	5.6%	48.1%	19.9%	26.4%

== Governance ==
Harrow Council has been governed by the Conservative Party since 2022. The borough is represented by 22 wards,, 11 represented by two councillors and 11 represented by three councillors.

Harrow is in the Brent and Harrow constituency for the London Assembly which has been represented since May 2021 by Krupesh Hirani (Labour). Prior to this, it was represented by Navin Shah (Labour) between 2008 and 2021.

Keekira Thammaih was the first Indian and a first Asian to be the Mayor of Harrow, England in 2000 – 2001.

Since the 2010 general election, most of Harrow town has been part of the Harrow West parliamentary constituency, most recently represented by Gareth Thomas (Labour), but eastern districts such as Kenton fall within the Harrow East constituency which is represented by Bob Blackman (Conservative).

== Education ==
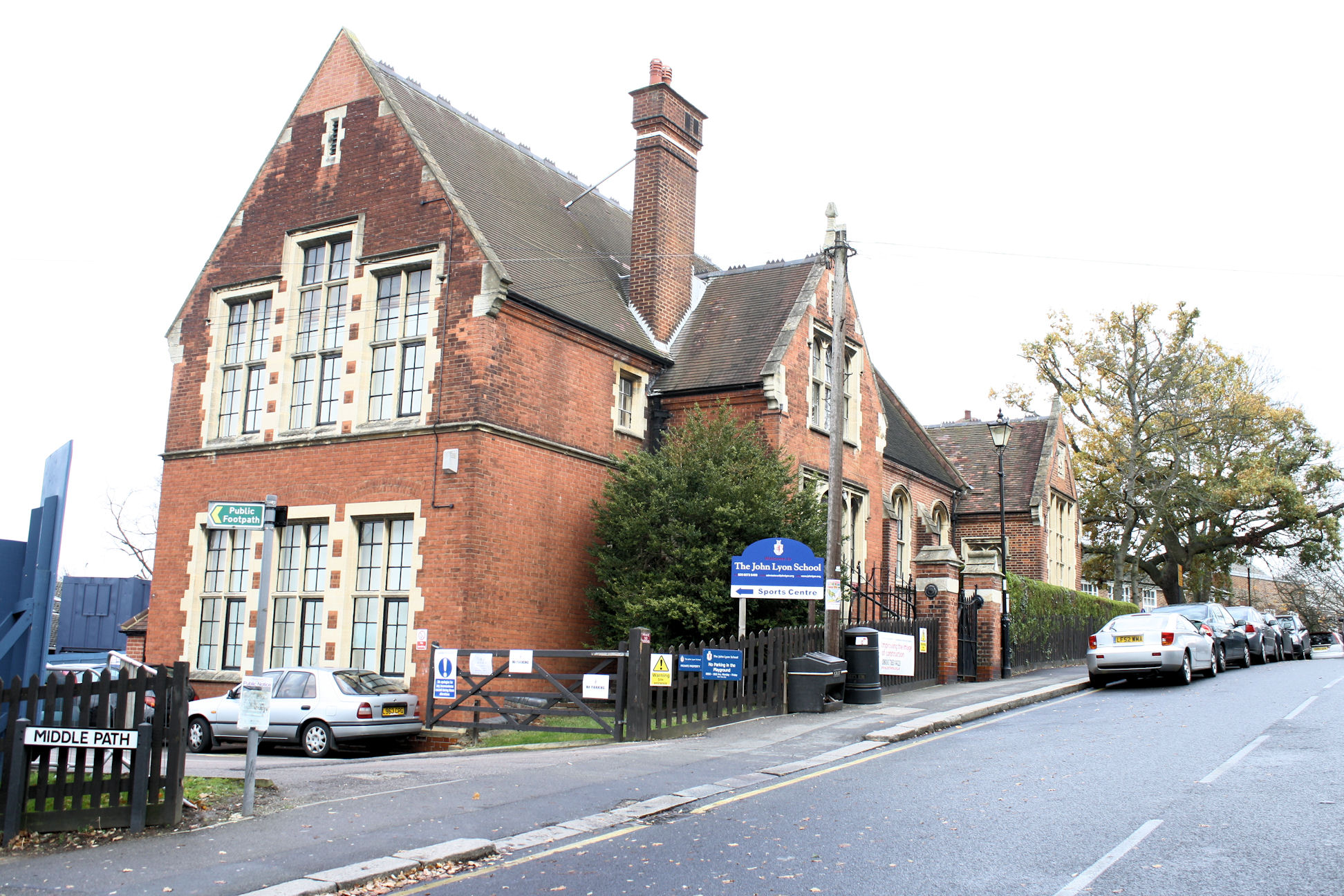
The John Lyon School - the building dates to the 1870s

Harrow is best known for Harrow School. An independent boarding school for boys, founded in 1572, Harrow School is considered one of the finest secondary schools in the world. The nearby John Lyon School is another boys' independent school, while another known school is the North London Collegiate School for girls located further in the borough in Edgware.

Harrow is also home to a large University of Westminster campus, located near Northwick Park and the hospital. It serves as the university's base for Media, Arts and Design. The school dates back to 1897 specialising in art, photography and fashion, becoming a college in the 1960s under the name Harrow College of Higher Education. It merged with Polytechnic of Central London (PCL) in 1990, now known as the University of Westminster.

Other educational institutes in or near central Harrow include: Harrow High School, Whitmore High School, St Dominic's Sixth Form College, Salvatorian College and Harrow College.

Greenhill School was built in the 1880s, but the building was demolished in 1967 to make way for shops on St Anns Road. The site is now home to a Marks & Spencer.

== Culture ==
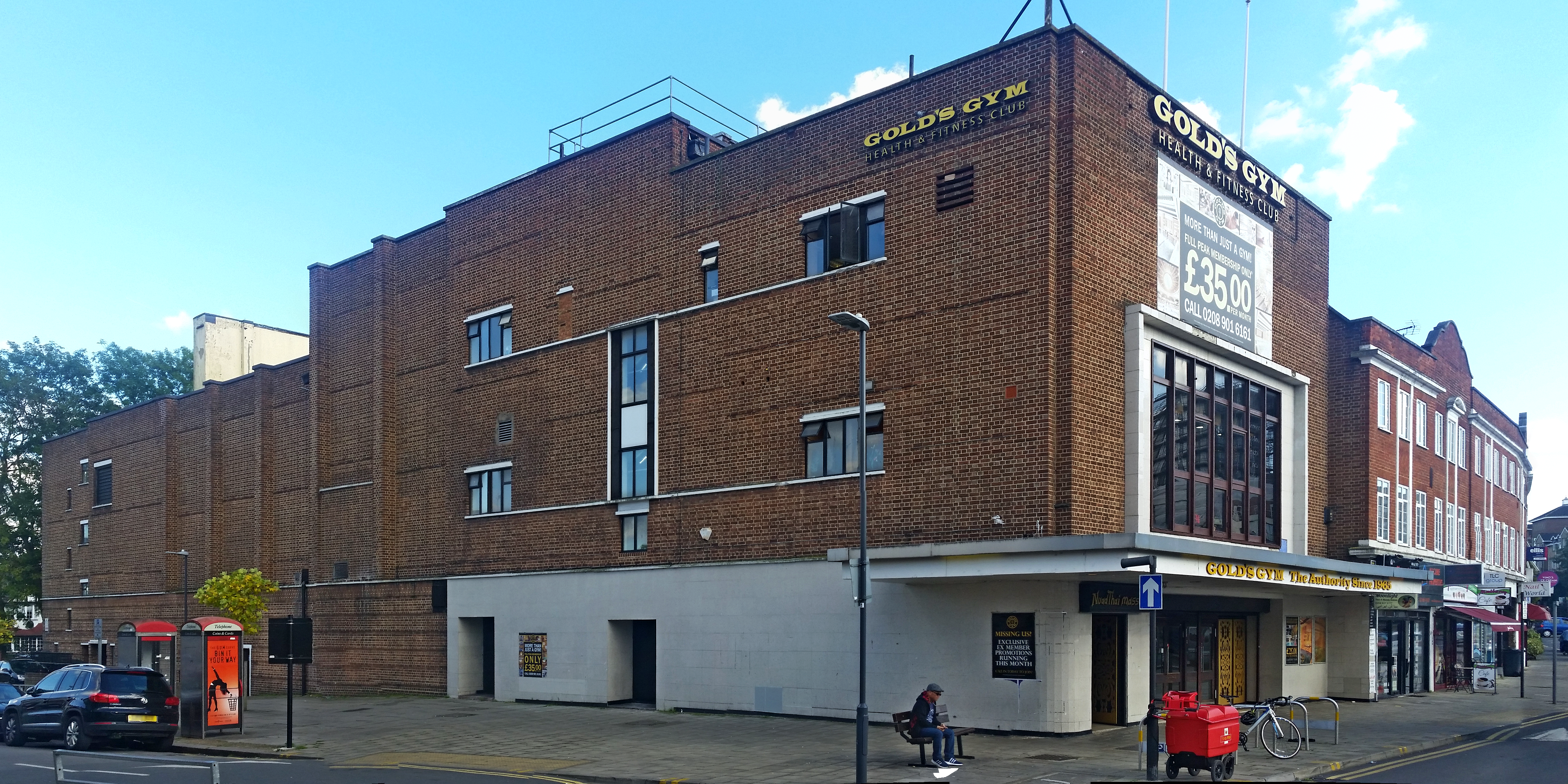
The former Granada Theatre, now a gymnasium

=== Arts ===
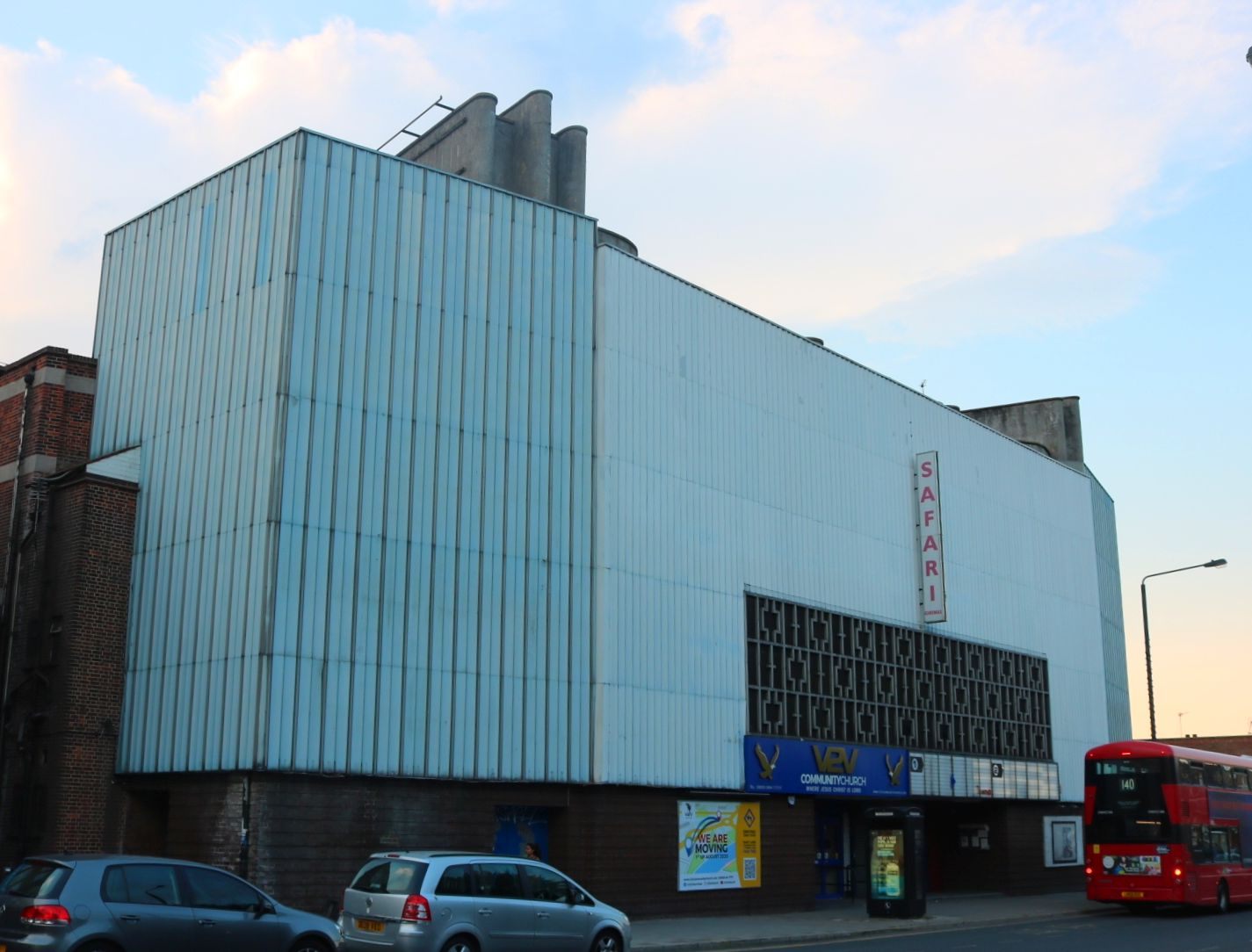
Safari Cinema

The borough's Harrow Arts Centre is located in Pinner and includes a theatre and several meeting rooms for various arts groups.

The St George's centre has a large Vue cinema. Formerly Sheepcote Road was home to Granada Theatre, opened in 1937, which became a 3 screen cinema in 1973. The building, interior designed by Theodore Komisarjevsky, was Grade II listed in 1988. The cinema went through ownership and name changes from 1989 until it was permanently closed in 1996, six months after the other cinema opening at St George's. After a few years in a derelict condition, the building became a health club gymnasium operated by Gold's Gym. The theatre's original Wurlitzer organ is retained in the building, although currently not accessible to the public, is reported to remain in perfect working condition.

An art-deco cinema called Dominion opened in 1936 adjoining Lower Mead football ground, on much of the site of Greenhill Farm. It was later purchased by ABC Cinemas, and the Dominion's original art deco design (by F.E. Bromige) was covered in new metal cladding in 1962. In the 1970s the lower floor was converted to a bingo hall and in the 1990s the cinema became the Safari, showing Bollywood films. This closed in the 20teens and it was not until January 2020 when plans to restore the art deco (and building 78 flats at the site) were approved by Harrow council. This was completed in 2026.

=== Religion ===
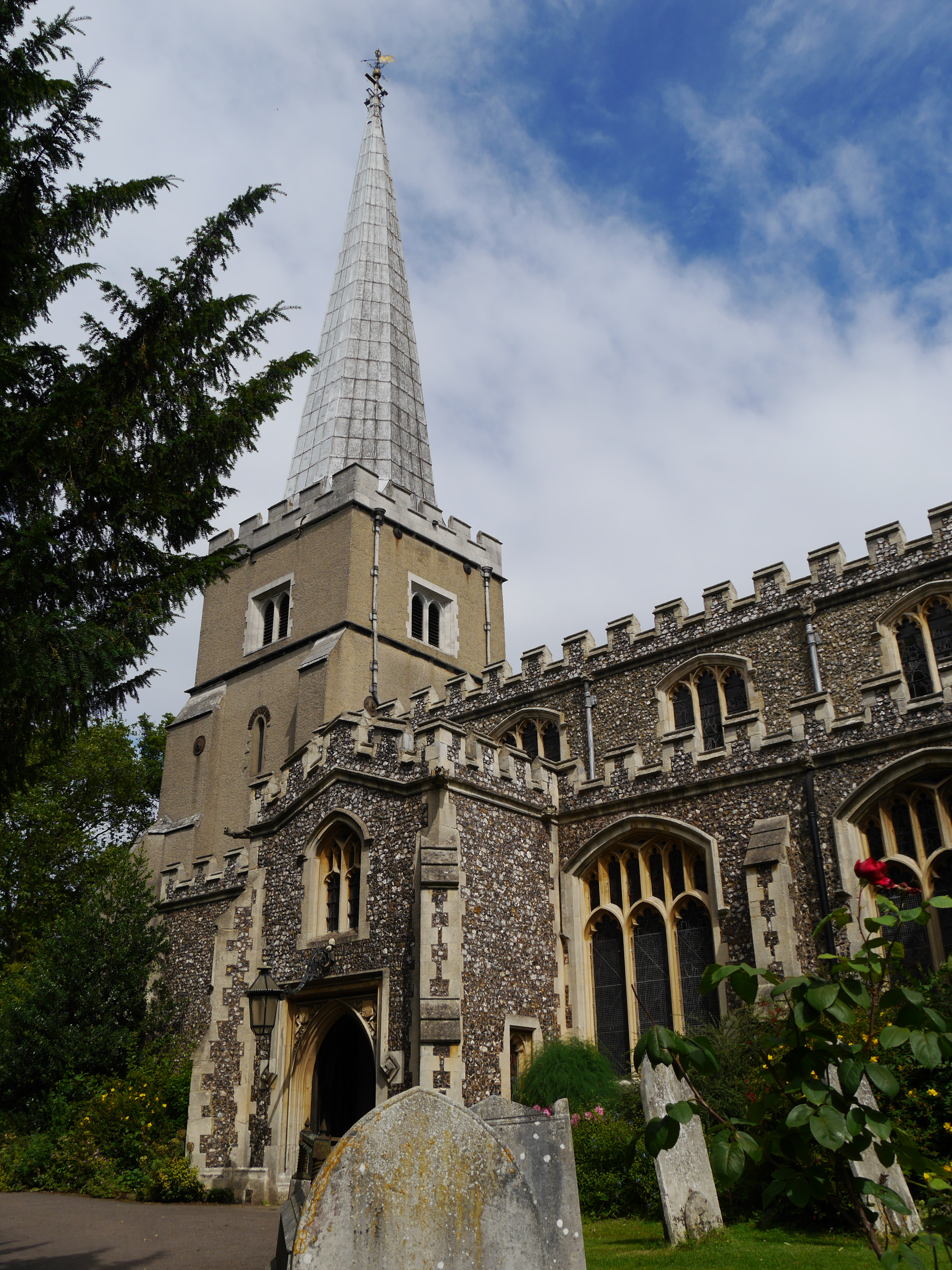
St Mary's Church on Harrow Hill

Some of the major churches in Harrow include the Grade I listed St Mary's Church, St John's Greenhill, Our Lady and St Thomas of Canterbury, All Saints Harrow Weald, Holy Trinity Wealdstone, Christ Church Roxeth, and Kenton Methodist Church.

Harrow has a Hindu temple dedicated to Sri Lord Ayyappa and is known as Sri Ayyappan Kovil, located in the Wealdstone neighbourhood. In the same area is the large Harrow Central Mosque, and a smaller local mosque, Masjid Imam Muqbil, is located in South Harrow. On Bessborough Road in the town is the Mosaic Reform Synagogue, and there is a United Synagogue in the Kenton part of Harrow. There is a Zoroastrianism centre in Rayners Lane.

=== Media ===
The 1918 novel The Return of the Soldier is based in Harrow.

The wedding of characters Peggy Mitchell and Frank Butcher of EastEnders in 1999 was filmed in Harrow. The classroom in Harry Potter and the Philosopher's Stone was filmed at the Fourth Form Room of Harrow School. The school was also used to shoot many scenes of the drama The Crown. The British Asian soap drama Cloud 9 was shot in Harrow in 2013. The exterior of Clark's house in the 2016 film Me Before You was shot in Harrow.

Scenes from the 1960 comedy film "School for Scoundrels" were filmed at a car dealership on Pinner Road, Harrow.

The Harrow Times is a local newspaper for the borough, and formerly the historic Harrow Observer that dates back to the 19th century. The Brent & Kilburn Times and Watford Observer also cover Harrow.

Radio Harrow is a local charity radio that broadcasts from Northwick Park Hospital. Launched in 2015 in its current form, its predecessor Radio Northwick Park had already been broadcasting for four decades before. A student radio called Smoke Radio broadcasts from the University of Westminster campus since 2004.

=== Sports ===
Harrow is represented by the association football club Wealdstone F.C., who play in the National League (fifth tier); they are based in Ruislip, moving from their original stadium in Harrow in 1991. Another local club is Harrow Borough F.C. who are based at Earlsmead Stadium and currently play in the Isthmian League Premier Division (seventh tier).

Harrow Leisure Centre and Harrow Skate Park are located by Byron Park in Wealdstone.

There is a golf course at Northwick Park.

== Public services ==
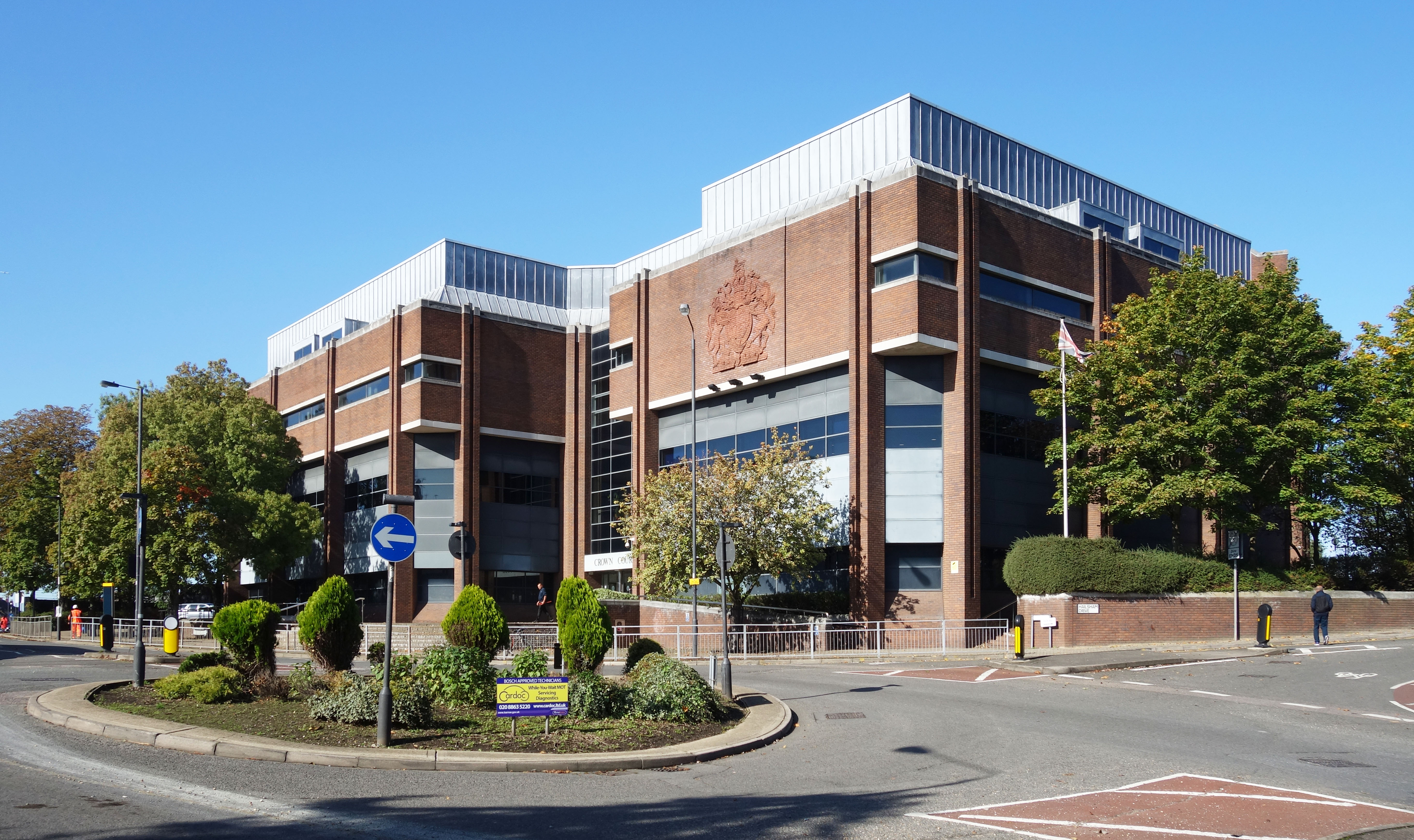
Harrow Crown Court

Harrow borough is patrolled by the Metropolitan Police (the territorial police force in Greater London). The service is mainly provided through Harrow Police Station on Northolt Road in South Harrow, and the borough overall has contact points supported by 22 Safer Neighbourhoods teams. Previous police stations at Kirkland House and in Wealdstone have closed down in the 2010s. The borough's basic command unit is combined with the London boroughs of Barnet and Brent.

Harrow is served by Northwick Park Hospital and specialists St Mark's Hospital and Royal National Orthopaedic Hospital (in Stanmore), which are run by National Health Service. The local Harrow CCG manages public provision of homecare throughout Harrow which is state funded. A private hospital called Clementine Churchill is located in Harrow-on-the-Hill.

== Transport ==
=== Rail and London Underground ===
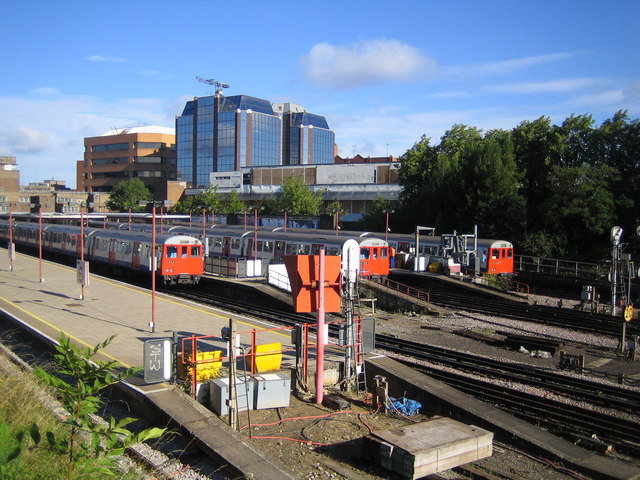
Underground trains at the platforms of Harrow-on-the-Hill station.

Harrow is served by many London Underground and National Rail services:

- Harrow-on-the-Hill (Metropolitan line & Aylesbury Line/Chiltern Railways) (Note: Not in Harrow on the Hill, as close to the foot of the hill and long outside of its ward boundary.)
- Harrow & Wealdstone (Bakerloo line, London Overground, London Northwestern Railway and Southern)
- West Harrow (Metropolitan line)
- South Harrow (Piccadilly line)
- Rayners Lane (Metropolitan/Piccadilly lines)
- North Harrow (Metropolitan line)
- Kenton (Bakerloo line & London Overground)
- Headstone Lane (London Overground)
- Northolt Park (Chiltern Main Line/Chiltern Railways) [On Boundary between Ealing & Harrow]
- Sudbury Hill Harrow (Chiltern Main Line/Chiltern Railways)
- Northwick Park (Metropolitan line) [On boundary between Brent & Harrow]
- Sudbury Hill (Piccadilly line)

Harrow-on-the-Hill is the town's central station, located on College Road/Lowlands Road. The station provides direct Underground and rail links to the West End, the City, Uxbridge, and through the Chiltern Hills to Aylesbury. The other major station – and both the largest and busiest of Harrow – is Harrow & Wealdstone, a short distance north from the town, which has direct trains to the West End, Croydon, Gatwick Airport, Watford, Hemel Hempstead and beyond towards Brighton and Birmingham respectively. Both stations are in London fare zone 5. Trains towards Gerrards Cross are served by the smaller Sudbury Hill Harrow station which also provides an alternative route towards the West Midlands.

Harrow-on-the-Hill is a much busier tube station compared with the town's other principal station, Harrow & Wealdstone, recording over 10.3 million London Underground passengers in 2018/2019. However, the latter is served more extensively by National Rail services, as well as the London Overground and because of this it's a busier National Rail station.

A short railway line called the Stanmore branch line formerly ran from Harrow & Wealdstone via Belmont to Stanmore Village, but this line was closed in 1964.

On 23 December 1991, the IRA exploded a bomb on a train at Harrow-on-the-Hill station; there were no injuries.

=== Bus ===
Buses at Harrow's bus station

Harrow bus station is adjacent to St Anns shopping centre and Harrow on the Hill railway station. All buses are managed by Transport for London and links are provided to Ruislip, Watford, Edgware, Northwood, Golders Green, Wembley, Ealing, Hayes and Heathrow Airport. Many local buses have a H-prefix in the range 9–19.

During the privatisation of London bus services, Harrow was one of the first places with its own London Regional Transport operating unit, called Harrow Buses and operating from November 1987 in red and cream branded livery. The scheme was not successful and the service gained the nickname "Harrowing Buses" from the local press.

Harrow was the place where the first major electronic contactless smart card technology was being tested on buses. In a £2 million trial that started in February 1994, cards were provided by London Transport at the bus station and could be used on 21 bus routes in Harrow, the largest trial of its kind in the world. Within two months, 9,000 smart photocards were issued. The scheme was a success by the time it ended in December 1995, and led to the development of the Oyster card in 2003.

=== Road ===
There are no trunk roads in the vicinity of Harrow. The A312 road starts in Harrow as Bessborough Road - however the A312's section in Harrow is merely an urban road, and the primary trunk road starts over 3 miles away in Northolt. It is here where there is a crossing with the A40 Western Avenue. The A406 is 5 miles away via Neasden, Wembley or Hanger Lane Gyratory. There is access to junction 2 of the M1 motorway 6 miles away via the A41 in Edgware.

== Gallery ==
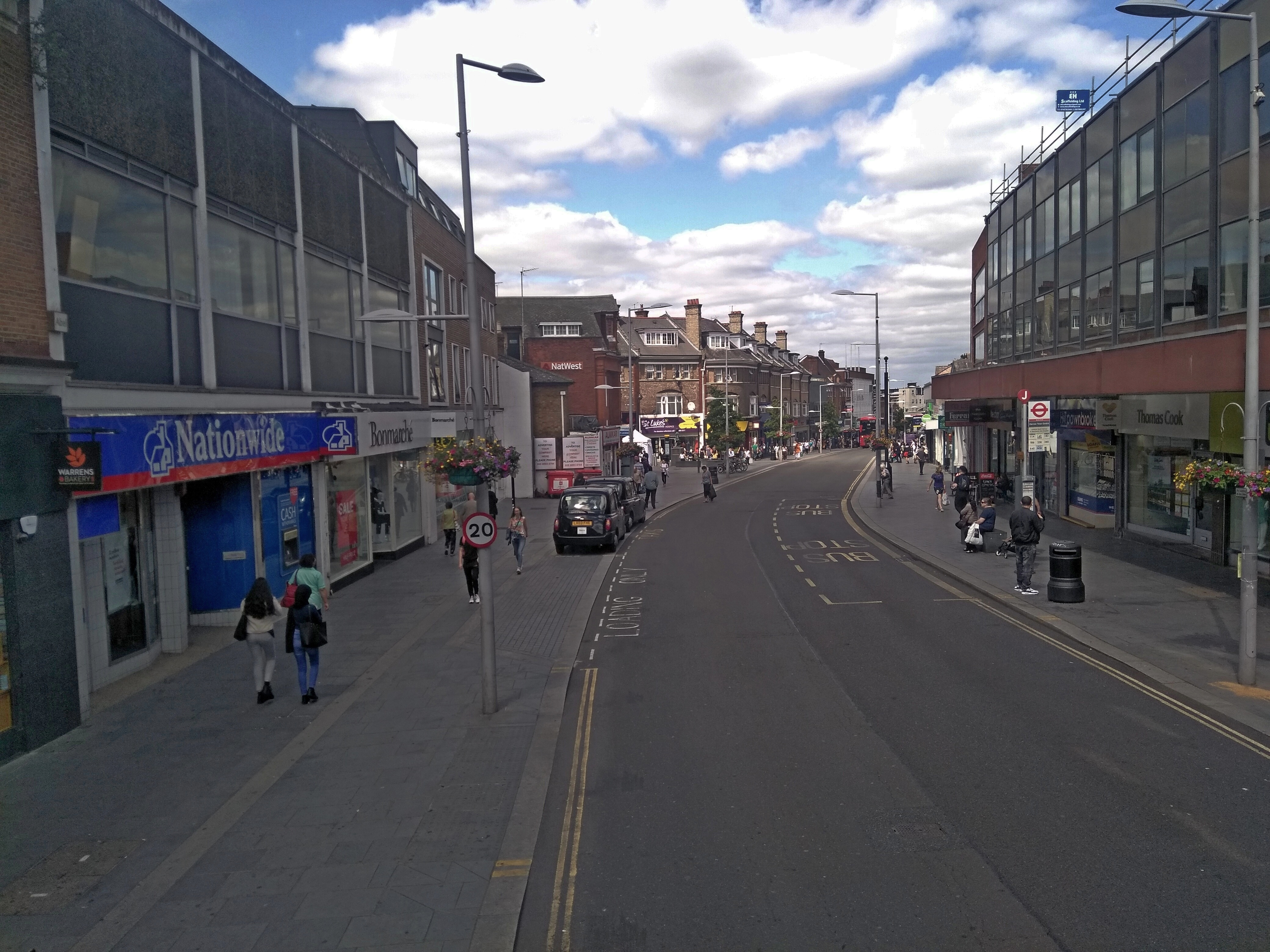
Station Road, Harrow

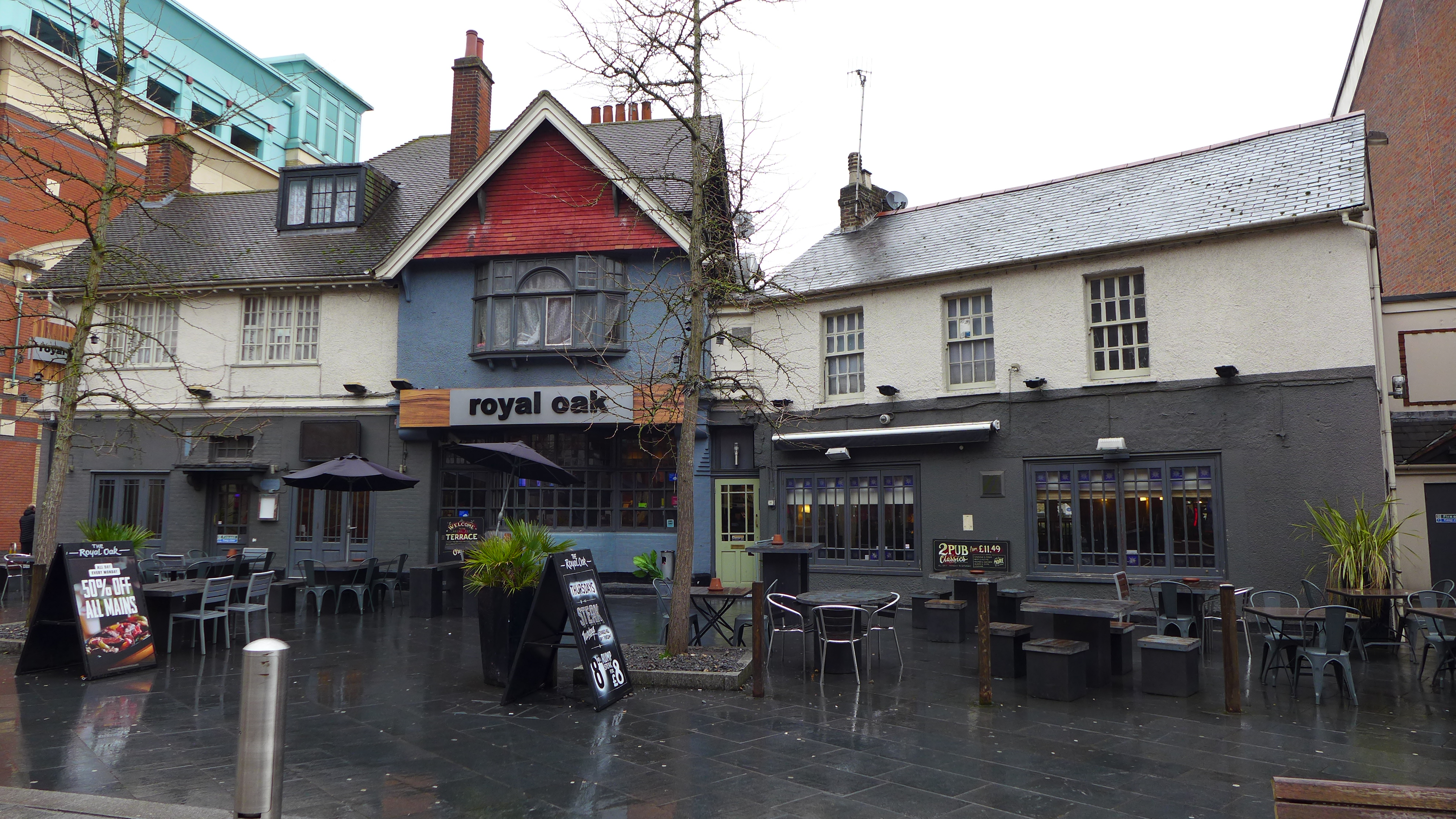
Royal Oak public house on St Anns Road has existed since the early 20th century and is locally listed

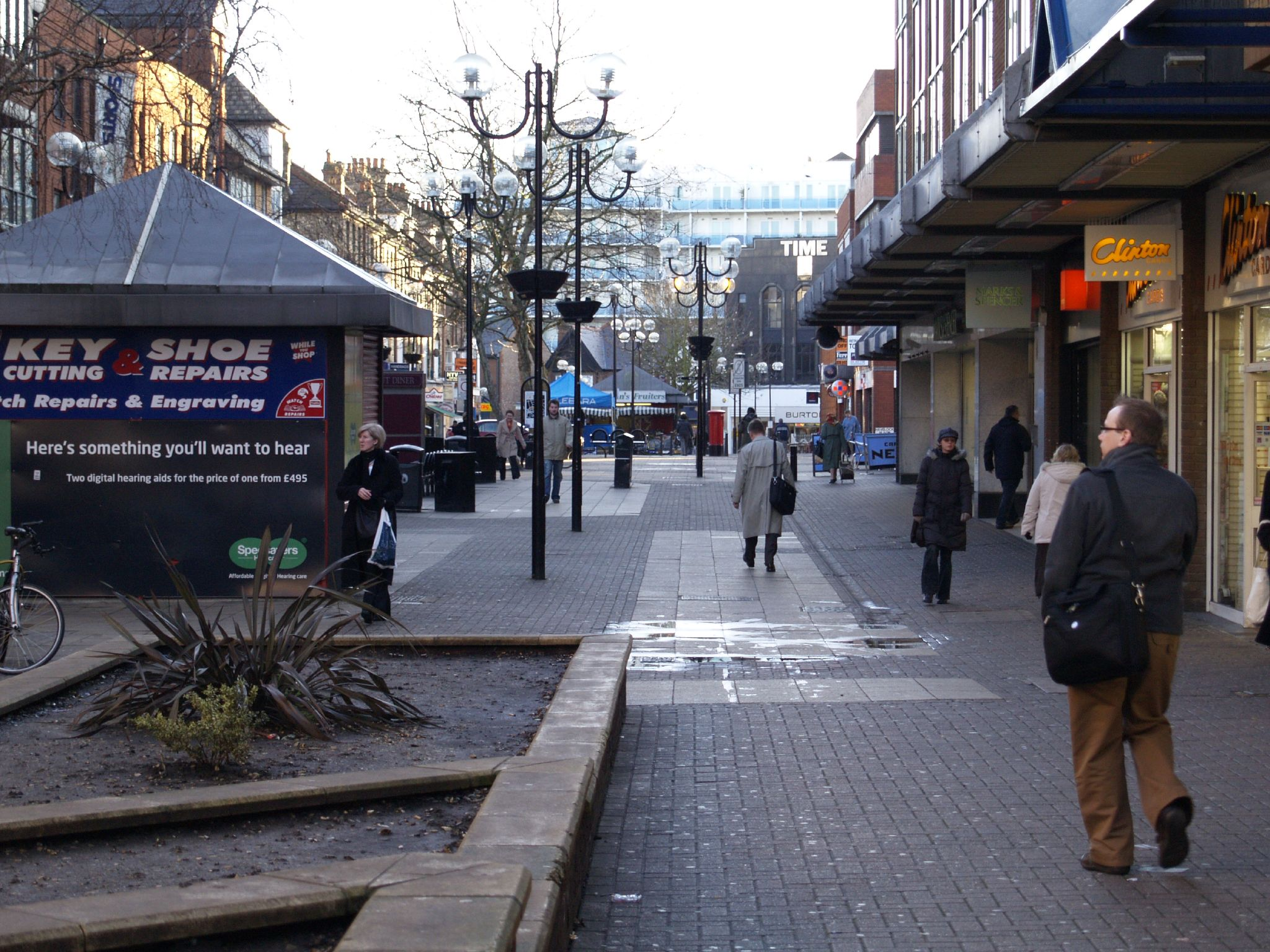
St Anns Road

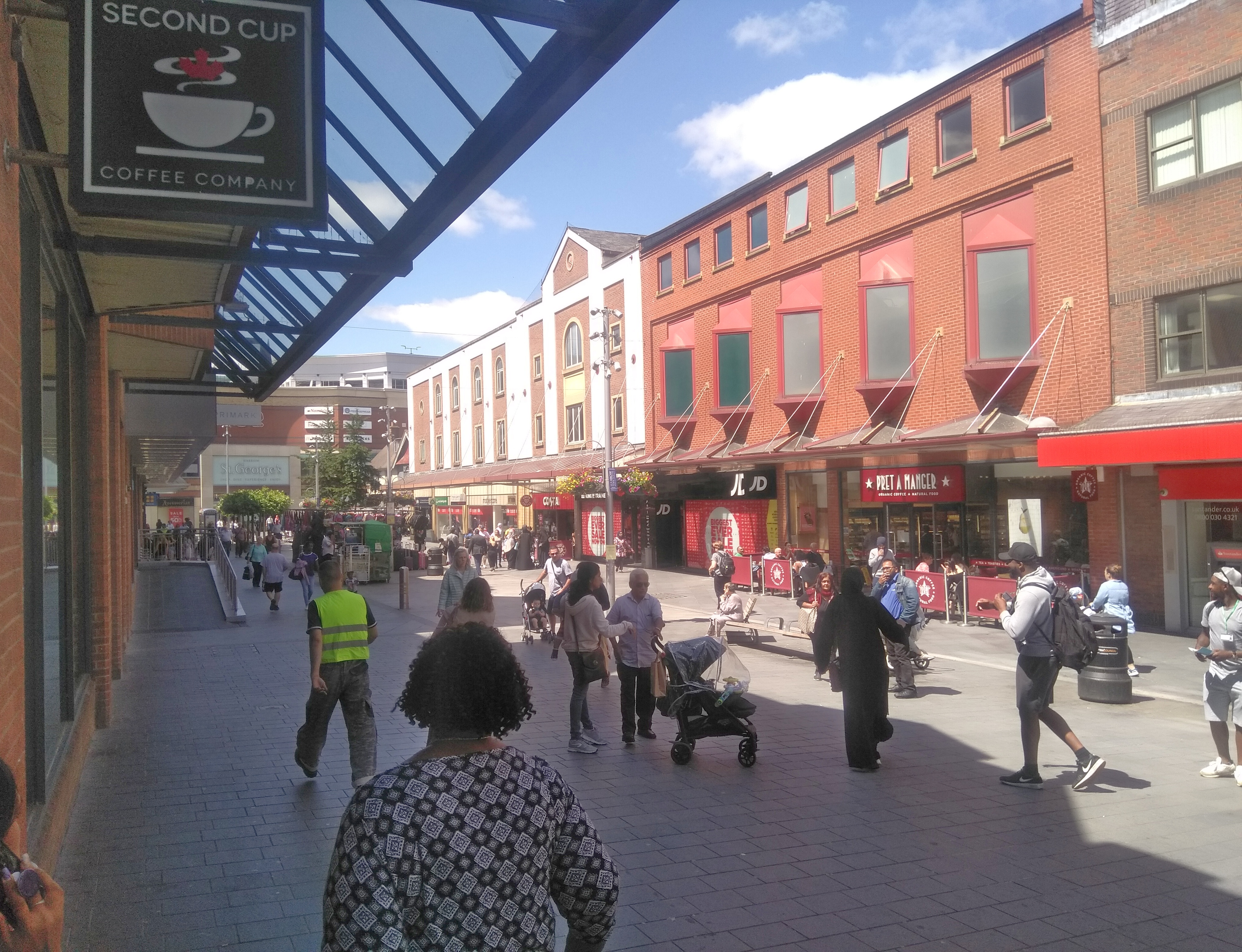
St Anns Road

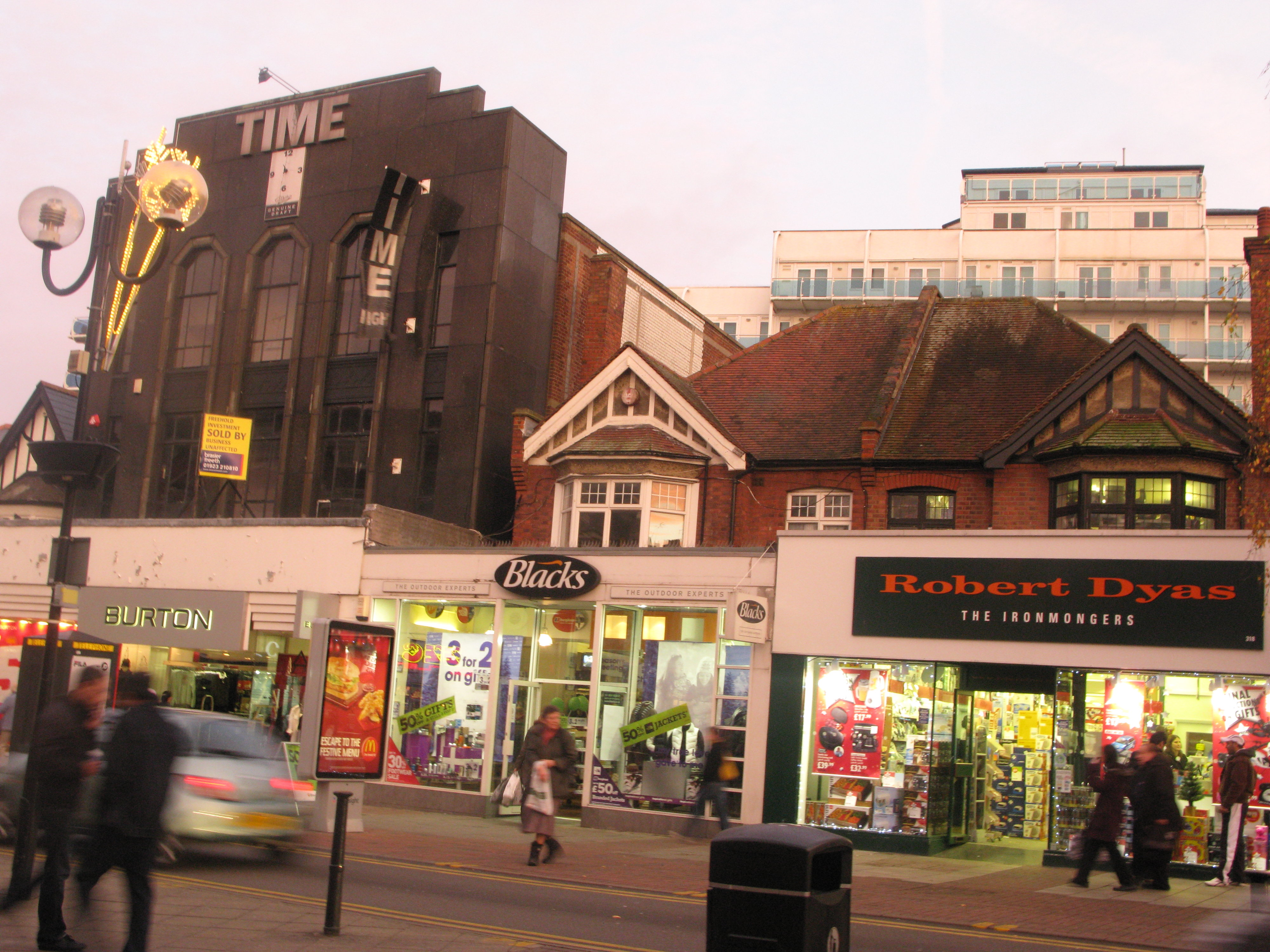
Middle section of Station Road, showing shops and the Time Building and apartments on Lyon Road behind it

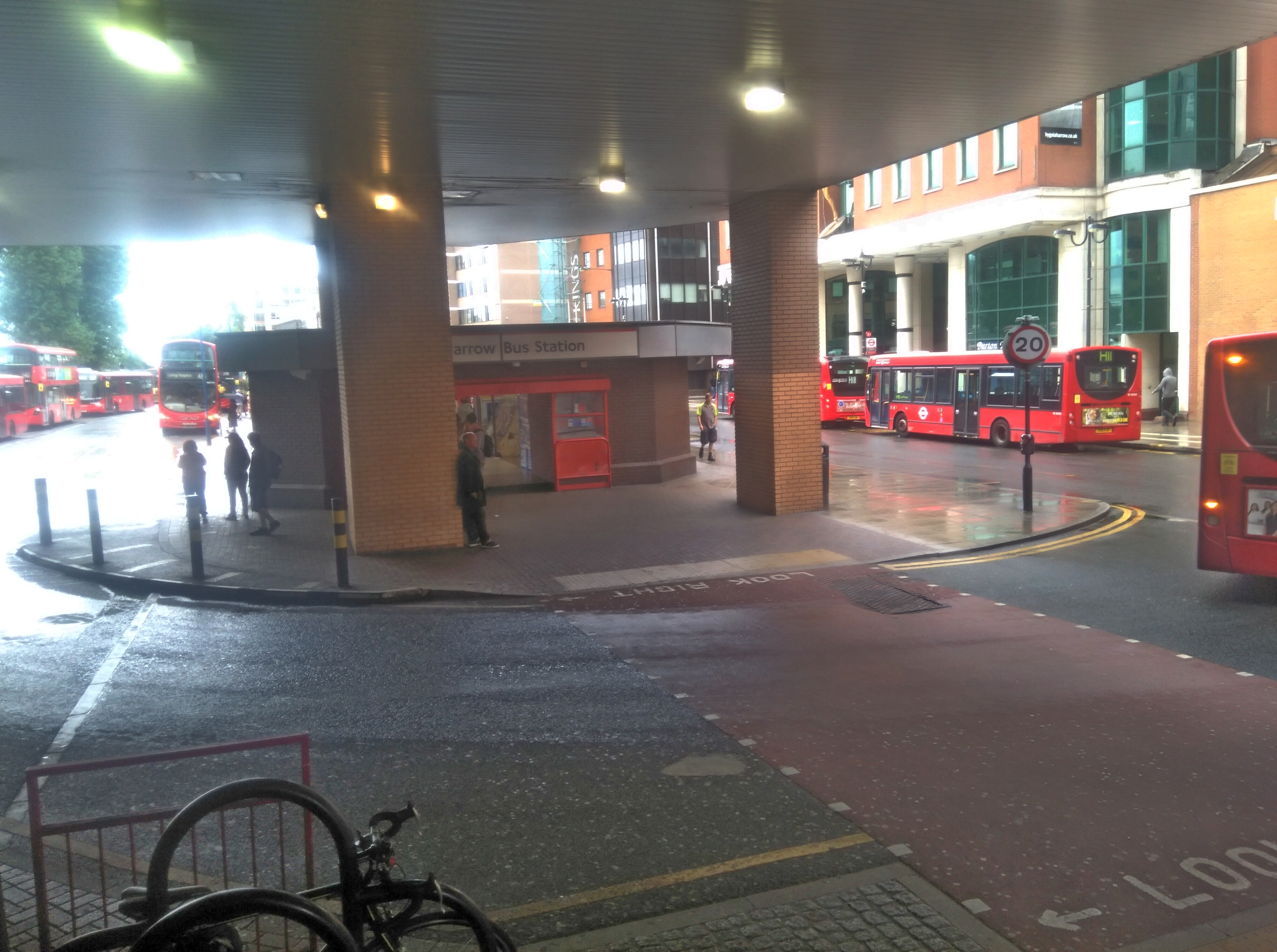
Harrow's central bus station

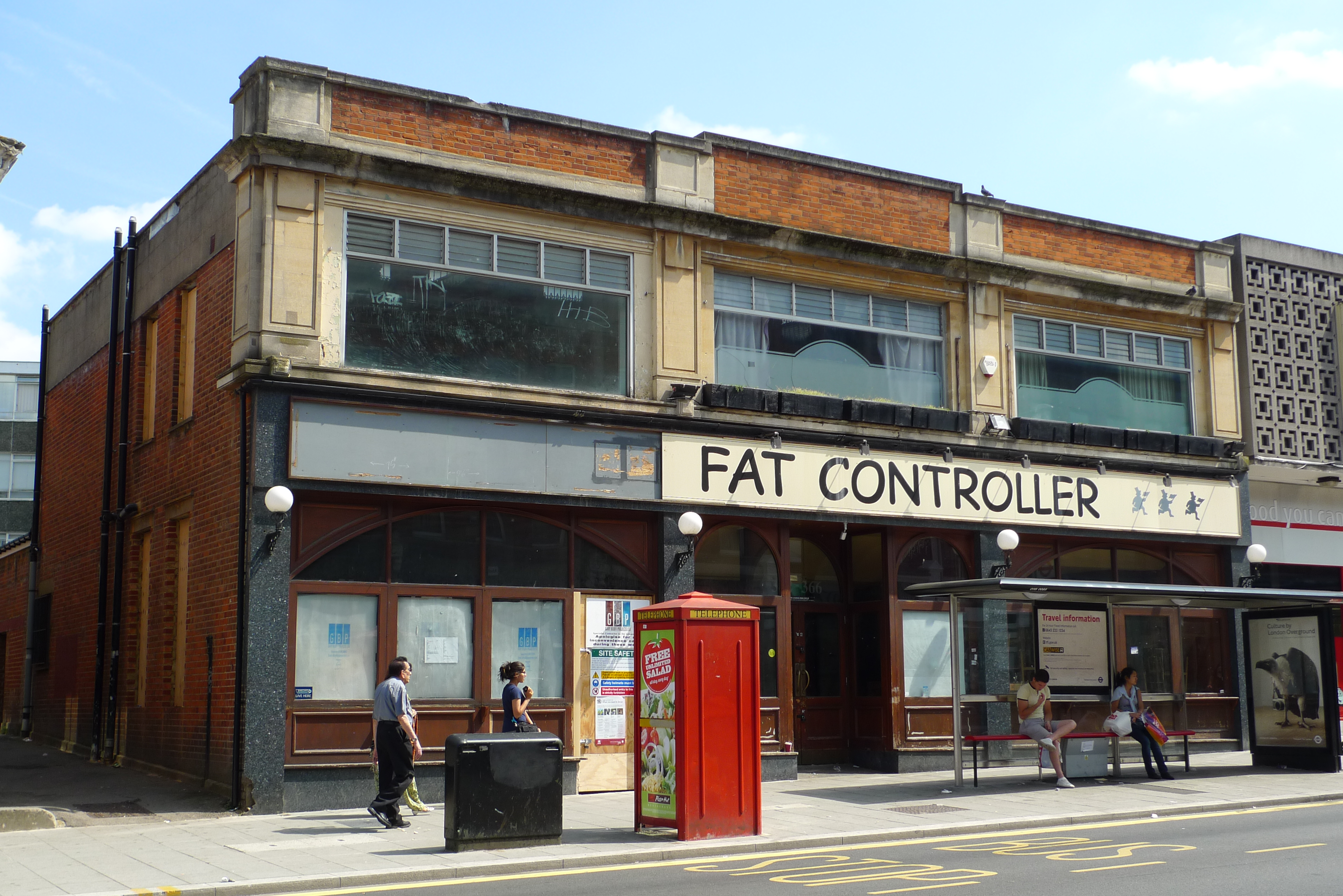
Former Fat Controller pub, closed in 2010

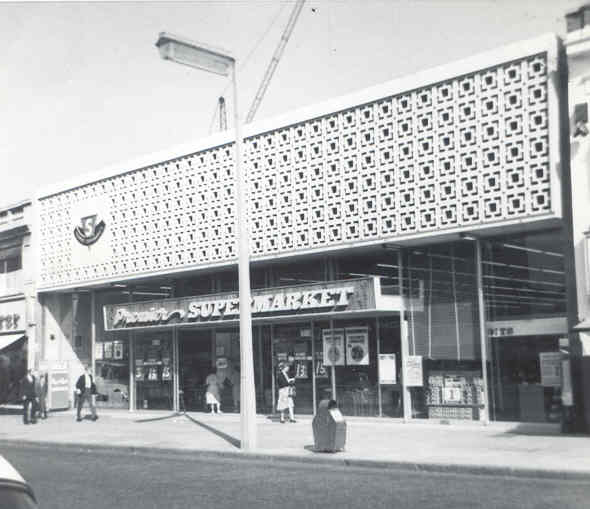
Premier Supermarket on Station Road (1963), now an Iceland supermarket; the site was originally home to the Harrow Coliseum cinema which was demolished in 1956

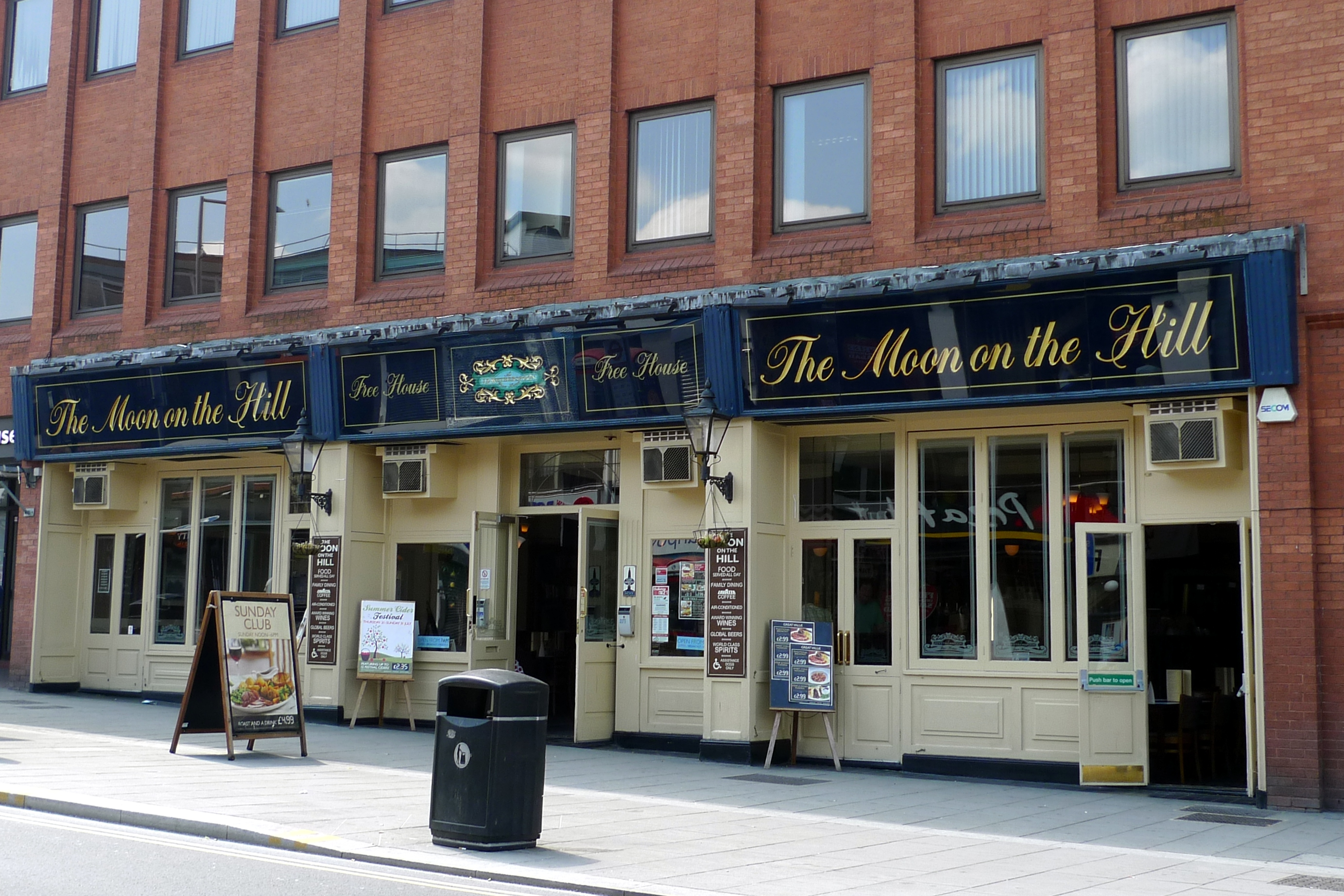
Moon on the Hill pub

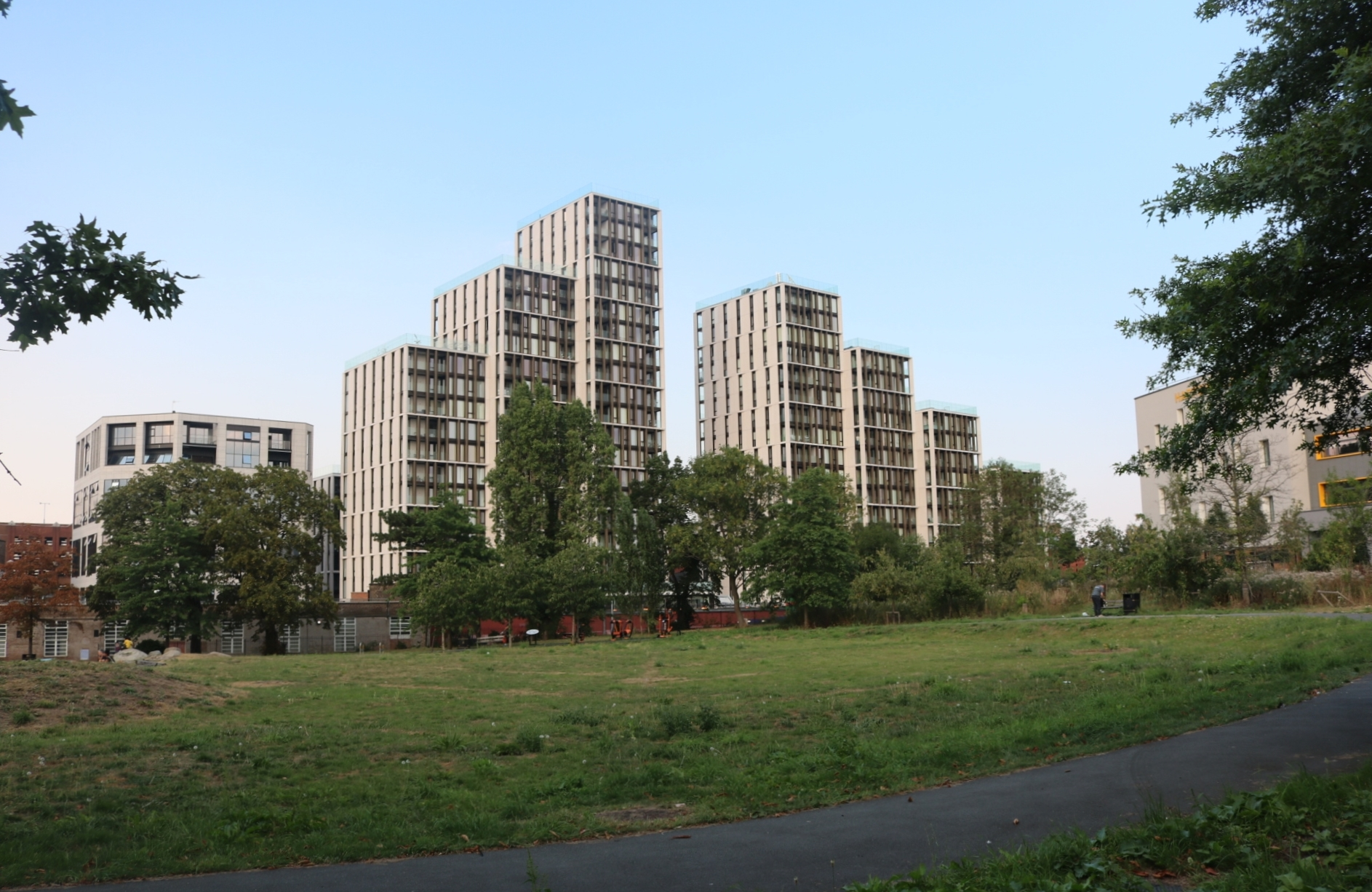
New built Harrow Square blocks

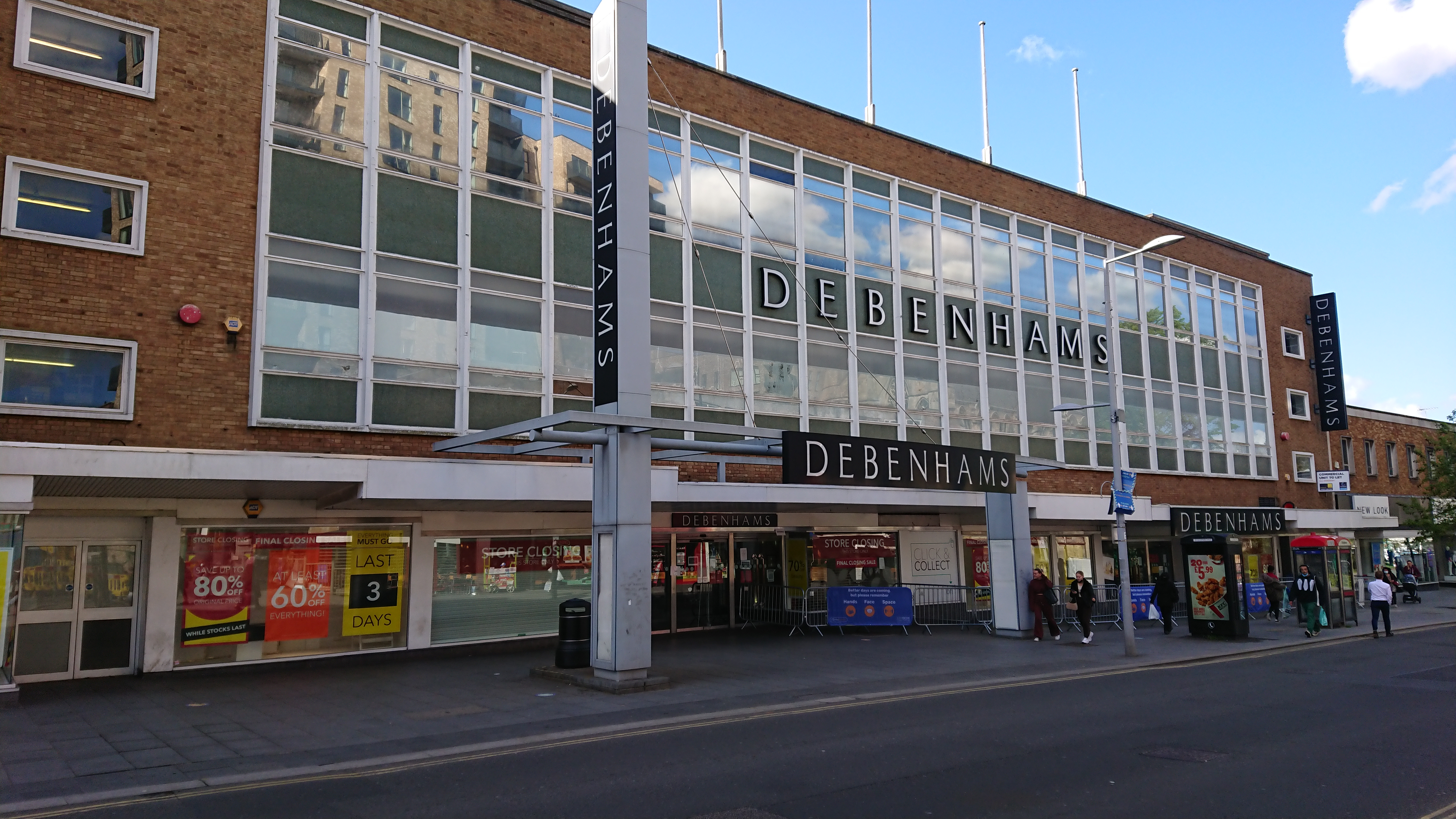
The old Debenhams shortly before its closure in May 2021. The site is becoming an independent department store called The Landmark.

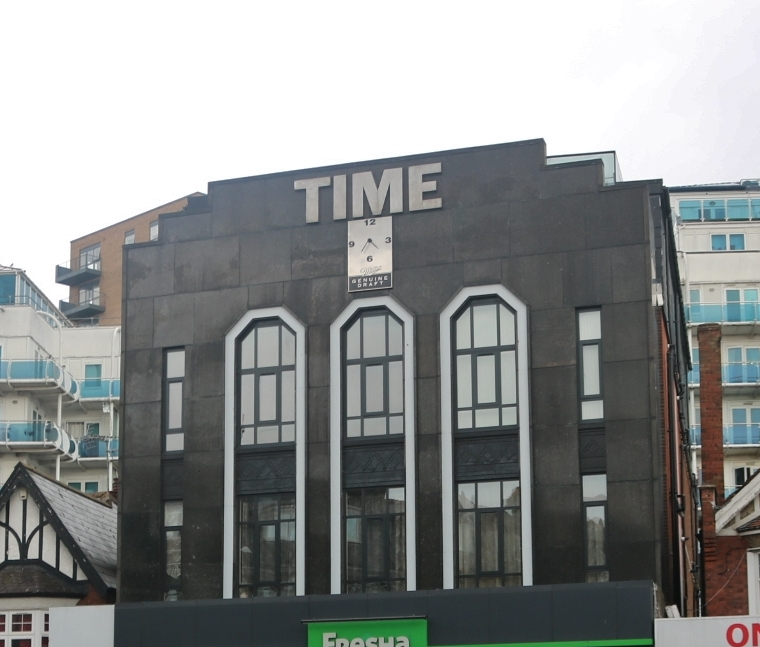
The Time Building on Station Road with a Miller-branded clock - formerly home of Time nightclub in 2000; today part converted into residential use

== Notable people ==
Some notable people who were born and/or grew up in the Borough of Harrow are shown below.

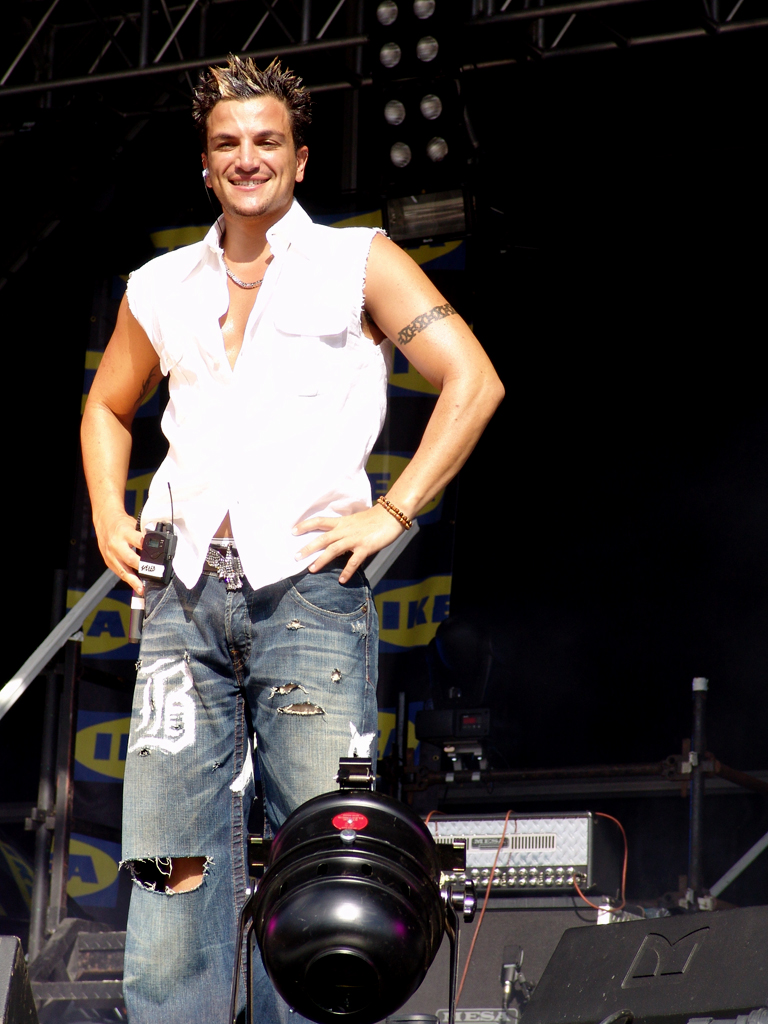
Peter Andre

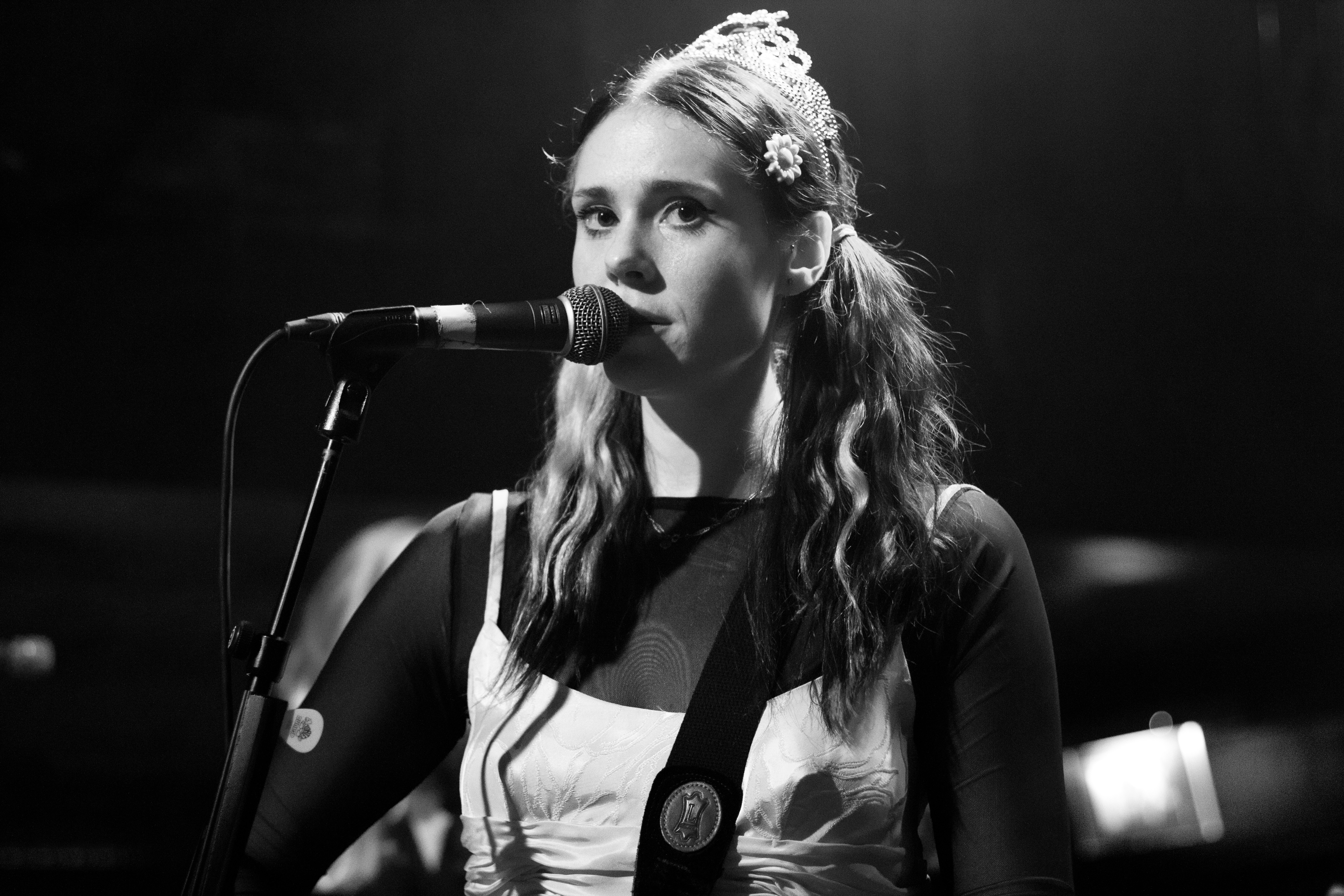
Kate Nash

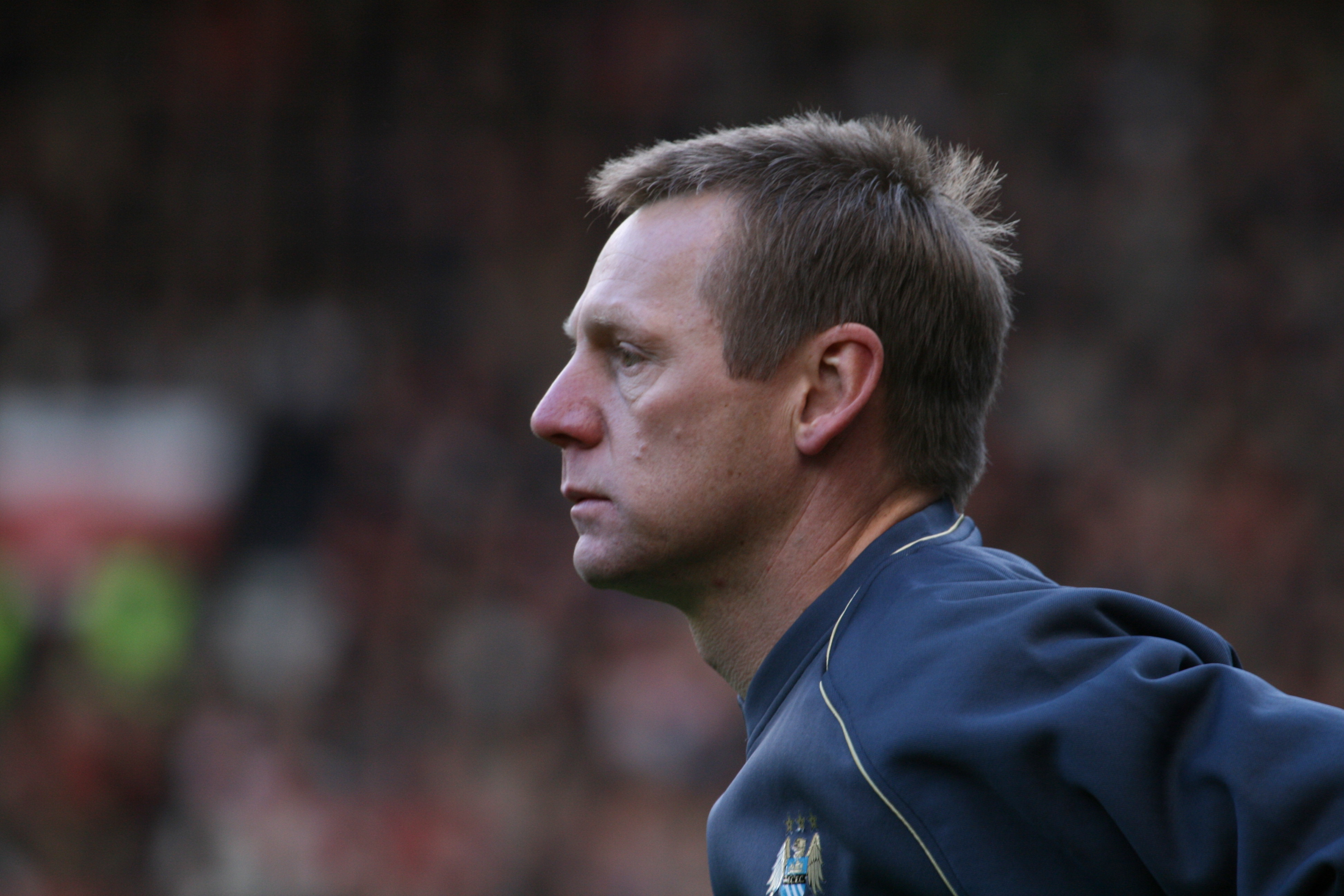
Stuart Pearce

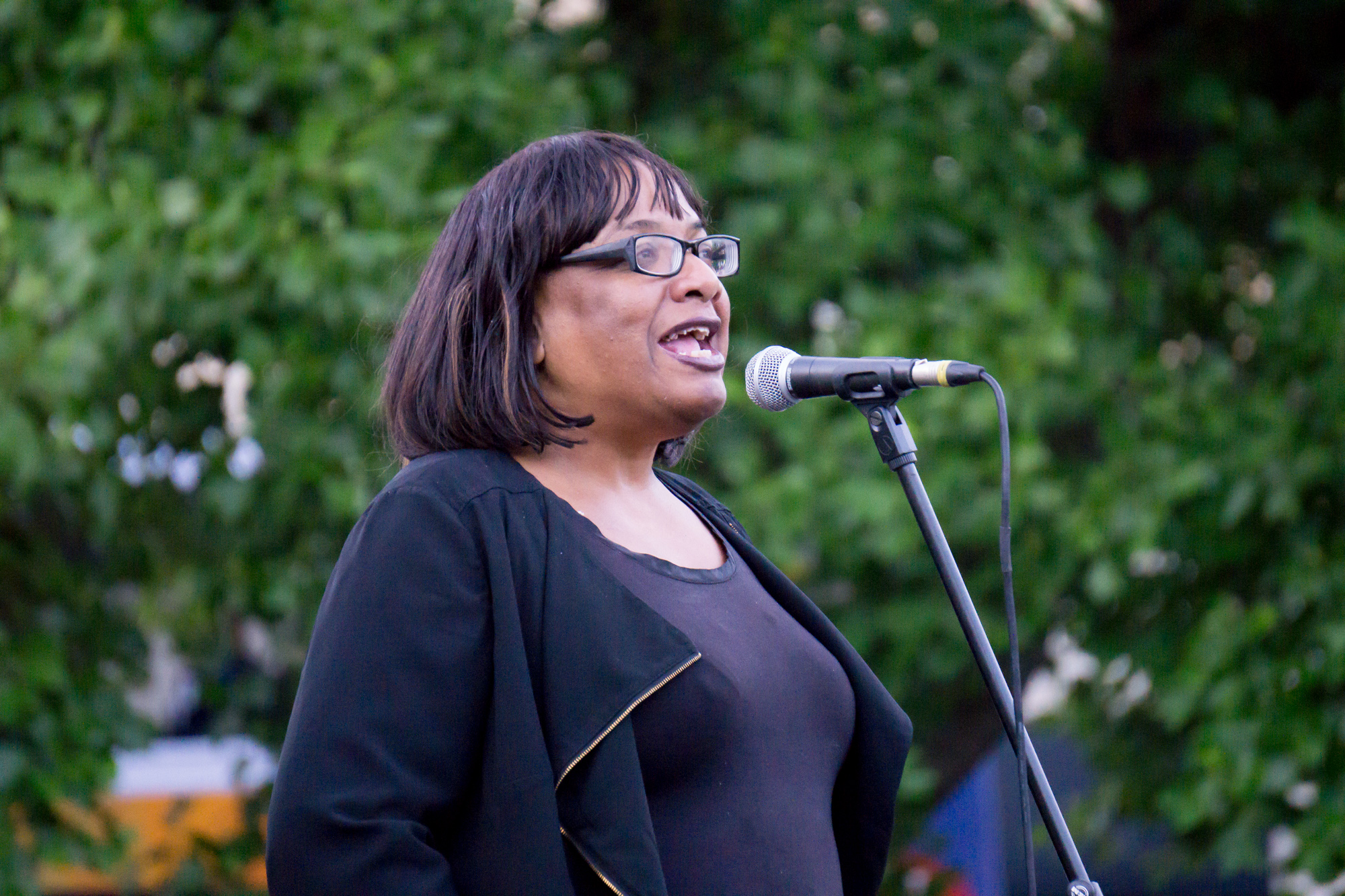
Diane Abbott

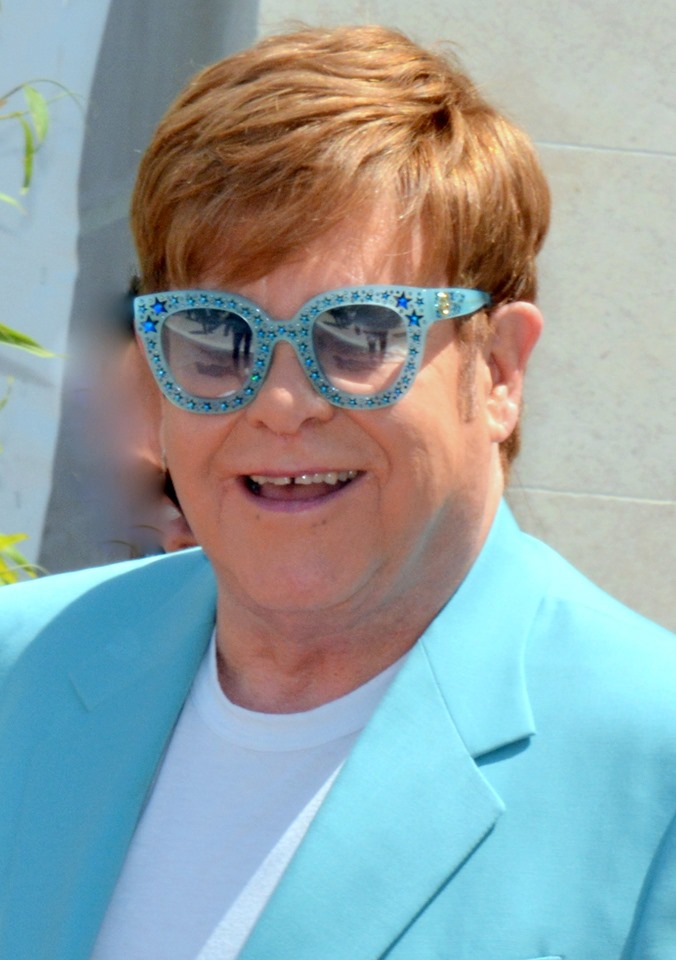
Sir Elton John

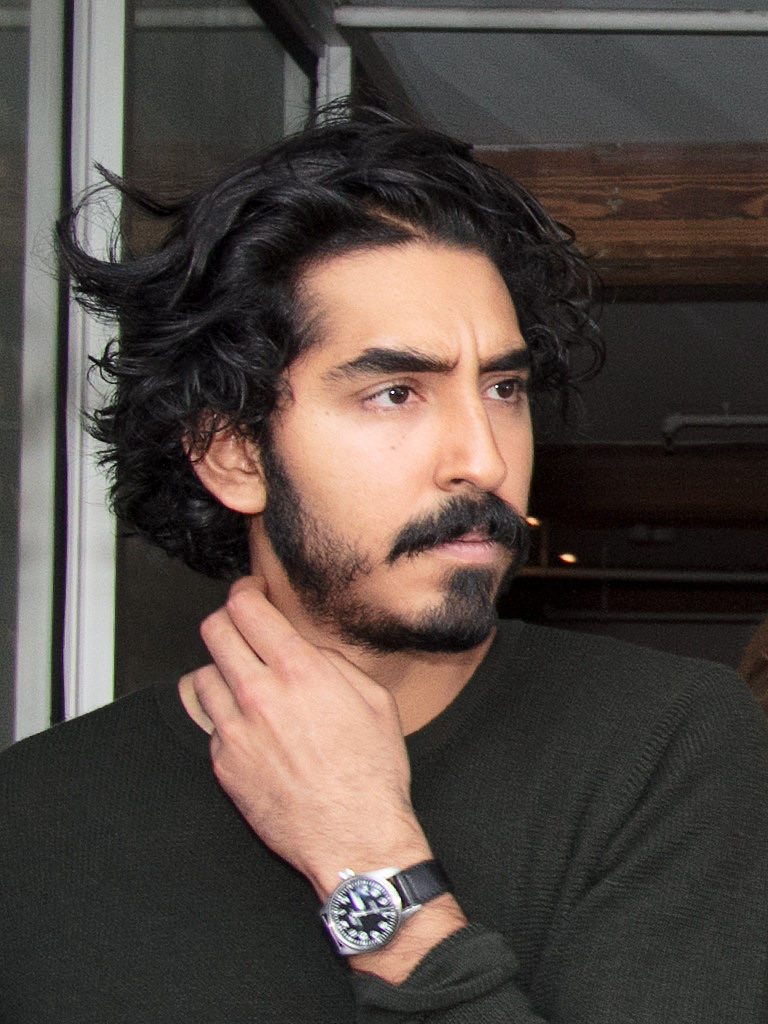
Dev Patel

== Notes and references ==
Notes
