= Diglis =

Suburb of Worcester in Worcestershire, England

Coordinates: 52.180121°N 2.221456°W

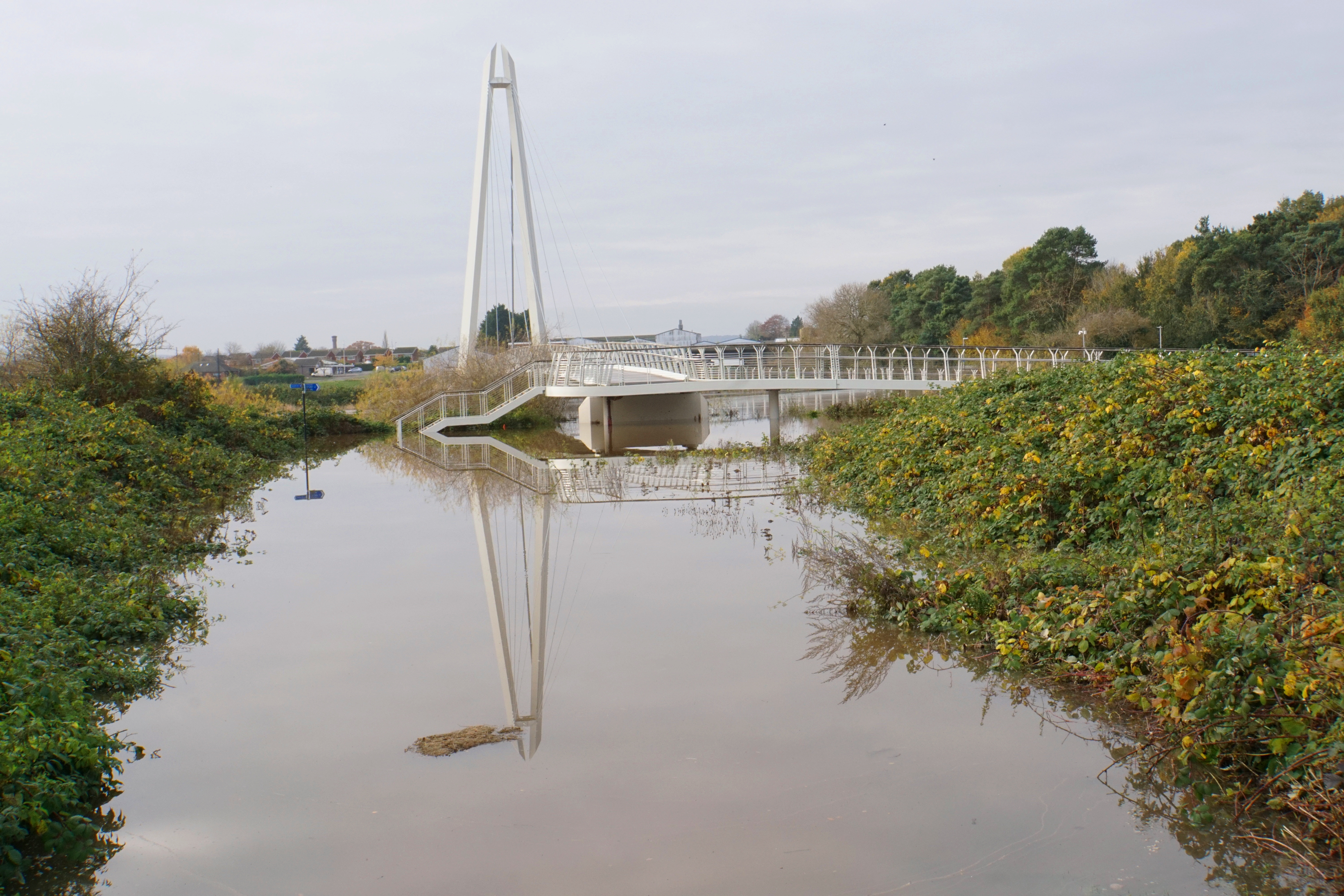
- Diglis Bridge, Diglis, Worcester

- Location within Worcestershire
  - London: 136 mi (219 km) SE
- District: Worcester
- Shire county: Worcestershire
- Region: West Midlands
- Country: England
- Sovereign state: United Kingdom
- Post town: Worcester
- Postcode district: WR5
- Dialling code: 01905
- Police: West Mercia
- Fire: Hereford and Worcester
- Ambulance: West Midlands
- UK Parliament: Worcester

Diglis is an inner-city area and suburb of Worcester in Worcestershire, England. It is located around half a mile south of the city centre on the banks of River Severn.

Diglis is an Anglicised adaptation of its original name d'Eglise, which comes from the Anglo-Norman French, meaning 'of the church', owing the land previously being owned by the monastery associated with the present day cathedral to the north.

The Worcester and Birmingham Canal starts in Diglis, connected to the Severn. Diglis Lock is a wide-beam lock allowing river craft access to Diglis Basin. Diglis Island is a sliver of land in the middle of the River Severn opposite the opening of The Worcester and Birmingham Canal, which has featured art displays and tours. Diglis House Hotel sits on the banks of the River Severn to the south of Worcester Cathedral. The area immediately next to the river is often affected by flooding such as in autumn 2000 and summer 2007. New apartments have been built in Diglis and there has been some investment in the popular waterfront areas with tourists. Diglis Bridge, a pedestrian and cycle bridge across the Severn, opened in 2010 linking Diglis and St Peter's with Lower Wick. In 2021, Princess Anne opened a fish viewing gallery at the Severn Bridge.
