= Diglis Basin =

Canal basin in Worcester, England

Coordinates: 52.1834°N 2.2206°W

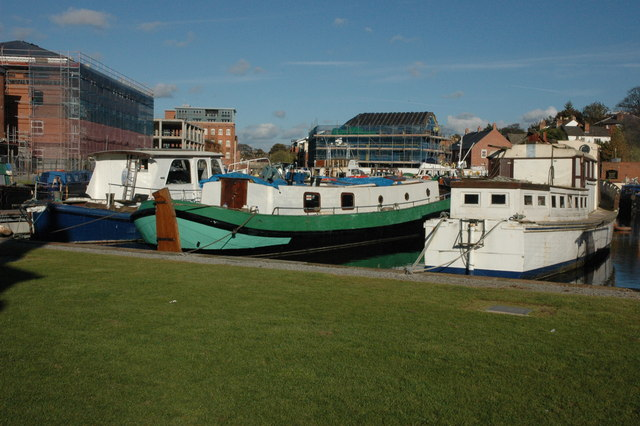
A view of Diglis Basin. The Worcester and Birmingham canal continues in the gap between buildings visible at the rear of the photo

Diglis Basin is a canal basin on the Worcester and Birmingham Canal. It is situated in Diglis in the centre of Worcester, England, near The Commandery (a command post during the English Civil War).

To the north is Tibberton (8.41 miles and 14 locks away) and to the west is Diglis Junction (0.25 miles and 2 locks to the west) where the canal meets the River Severn. It is the first basin (with associated amenities) reached after joining the canal from the River Severn.

== Facilities available ==
With its central position in Worcester, Diglis Basin is very convenient for shops and leisure facilities in the centre of the city. It also has the following facilities of its own:

- Water point
- Rubbish disposal
- Dry dock
