= Dines Green =

Suburb of Worcester in Worcestershire, England

Coordinates: 52.193031°N 2.253923°W

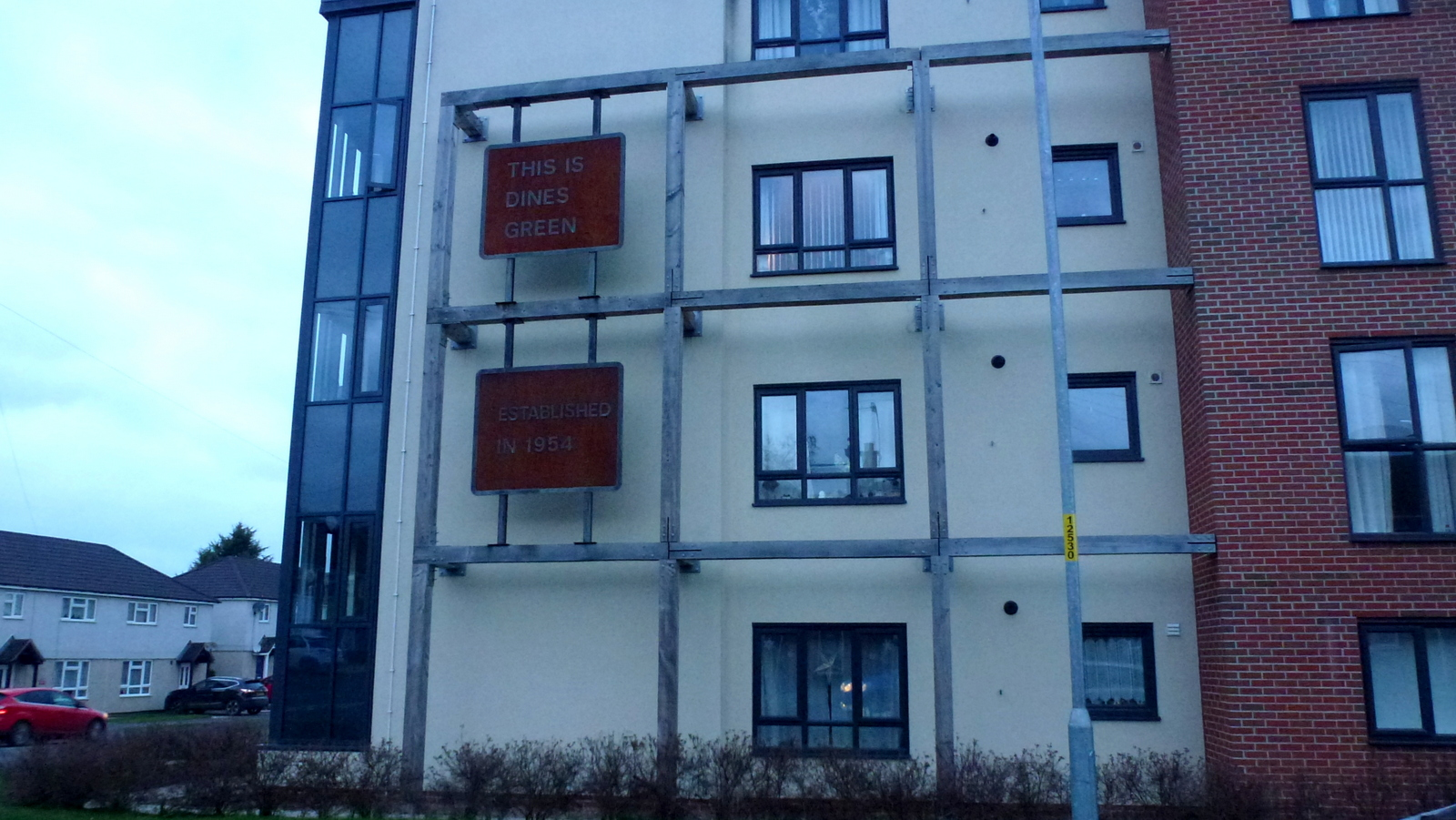
- Dines Green, Worcester

- Location within Worcestershire
  - London: 139 mi (224 km) SE
- District: Worcester
- Shire county: Worcestershire
- Region: West Midlands
- Country: England
- Sovereign state: United Kingdom
- Post town: Worcester
- Postcode district: WR2
- Dialling code: 01905
- Police: West Mercia
- Fire: Hereford and Worcester
- Ambulance: West Midlands
- UK Parliament: Worcester

Dines Green is a northwestern suburb of Worcester in Worcestershire, England. It lies in the St. John ward in the west of the city . Initially developed as council housing, the estate now consists of a mix of council and privately owned homes: 49% of households were renting from the council or another landlord at the 2001 census.

== History ==
Formerly farming land, Dines Green was built in the late 1950s by the building contractor Spicers and consisted of a mix of semi-detached homes and large blocks of flats. Worcester City Council at the time wanted uniformity in the front gardens of houses on the estate, turfing over any deviations from this uniformity. The vast majority of the semi-detached homes were built using precast concrete; these homes were updated in the 1980s with the concrete being stripped away and replaced with brick. The blocks of flats that were built using pre-cast concrete were demolished (also in the 1980s) and new "apartments" were built in their place.

The original residents of Dines Green were working class families at the lower end of the social scale. Employment amongst the residents was high though and centred upon mostly unskilled positions and qualified tradesmen. The 2001 census found little change: 42% of adults had no qualifications, but unemployment was close to the city average.

When Dines Green was built a small play area for children was provided, but it was lost together with other small grassed areas during the 1980s restoration of the estate.

=== 2007 Worcestershire Flooding ===
During the widespread flooding throughout 2007 in Worcestershire, the Dines Green area was hit by water running off the nearby fields and flooding peoples homes. As a result of the flooding, many of the telephone cables in the area were affected, resulting in residents receiving the wrong calls. Flooding was also reported in the area in June 1955.

== Amenities ==
There are several shops in Dines Green including a post office. The local church, St. Michaels Anglican Church was constructed with much of the estate surrounding it in the early 1960s. Manor Park Evangelical Church meet at Dines Green Primary School.

== Education ==
Dines Green Primary School is located on the estate, catering for 169 pupils. Every year the school holds a traditional May Day parade. Following ofsted reports, the school was placed in special measures in 1997 and 2002, however the school was later reassessed in 2006 as being good.

== Transport ==
First Midland Red have traditionally operated the majority of bus services in Worcester, including the Dines Green estate. Red Diamond started operations in competition with First from 1 September 2009, including a new night bus service on the estate. First used to operate a night service to Dines Green in 2002.

Red Diamond no longer operates services in Worcester City due to lack of commercial value returned, however, they do still operate other services (inc. school bus tendered contracts) across Worcestershire county.

Number	From	To	Via	Operator	Notes
30	Dines Green	Worcester		First	

== Expansion ==
As part of the South Worcestershire Joint Core Strategy plan, Dines Green has been earmarked to receive 3,500 extra homes. The construction will include primary and secondary schools, alongside extra shops and leisure facilities. A £100 million northern link road was planned to link the area to Barbourne, however in 2008 this plan was cancelled due to fears of increased commuting.

== Sport ==
Nathan Baker is a professional footballer who was born in Dines Green.
