= Jabez Allies =

English folklorist and antiquarian

Jabez Allies (22 October 1787 – 29 January 1856) was an English folklorist and antiquarian. He was one of the earliest writers on folklore.

== Life ==
Allies was the second son of Mr. William Allies, and was born in 1787 at Lulsley, Worcestershire, where his family had resided for generations. In early youth he was deeply impressed by the lingering relics of Roman and Saxon days and by the pastoral life that characterised his native place. He served a clerkship in London, and practiced there for some years as a solicitor. Numerous papers of his were read to the Society of Antiquaries of London, of which he was elected a fellow about 1840, and at the meetings of the Royal Archaeological Institute. He showed there much aptness for antiquarian discovery, and threw light upon vestiges of Roman occupation in his native county which Nash and other historians had regarded as unidentified.

Marrying Catherine, daughter of William Hartshorne, Esq., of Clipstone, Northamptonshire, by whom he had an only child, William Hartshorne Allies (who succeeded him), he quitted London, and resided for some years at Catherine Villa, in Lower Wick, now part of Worcester, taking part in all reunions and movements connected with Worcestershire and its history.

He died in 1856 at Tivoli House, Cheltenham, which he had purchased a few years before, and was buried in Leckhampton churchyard by the side of his wife, who had previously died on 28 May 1855, aged 74.

== Bibliography ==
- Observations on Certain Curious Indentations in the Old Red Sandstone of Worcestershire and Herefordshire considered as the Tracks of Antediluvian Animals, p. PR1, at Google Books (1835)
- On the Causes of Planetary Motion (1838)
- On the Ancient British, Roman, and Saxon Antiquities of Worcestershire (1840)
- The Jovial Hunter of Bromsgrove. Horne the Hunter, and Robin Hood (1845)
- The Ignis Fatuus, or Will o' the Wisp and the Fairies, p. PP7, at Google Books (1846)
- On The Ancient British, Roman, and Saxon Antiquities and Folk-lore of Worcestershire, p. PP1, at Google Books (1852) This was a much extended edition of the 1840 publication.

Besides papers in the Archæological Journal, he wrote many interesting letters on his favourite subjects in the Literary Gazette, 1845, et seq., and other magazines.
