= Worcester, England =

Cathedral city in Worcestershire, England

Worcester
- City and non-metropolitan district
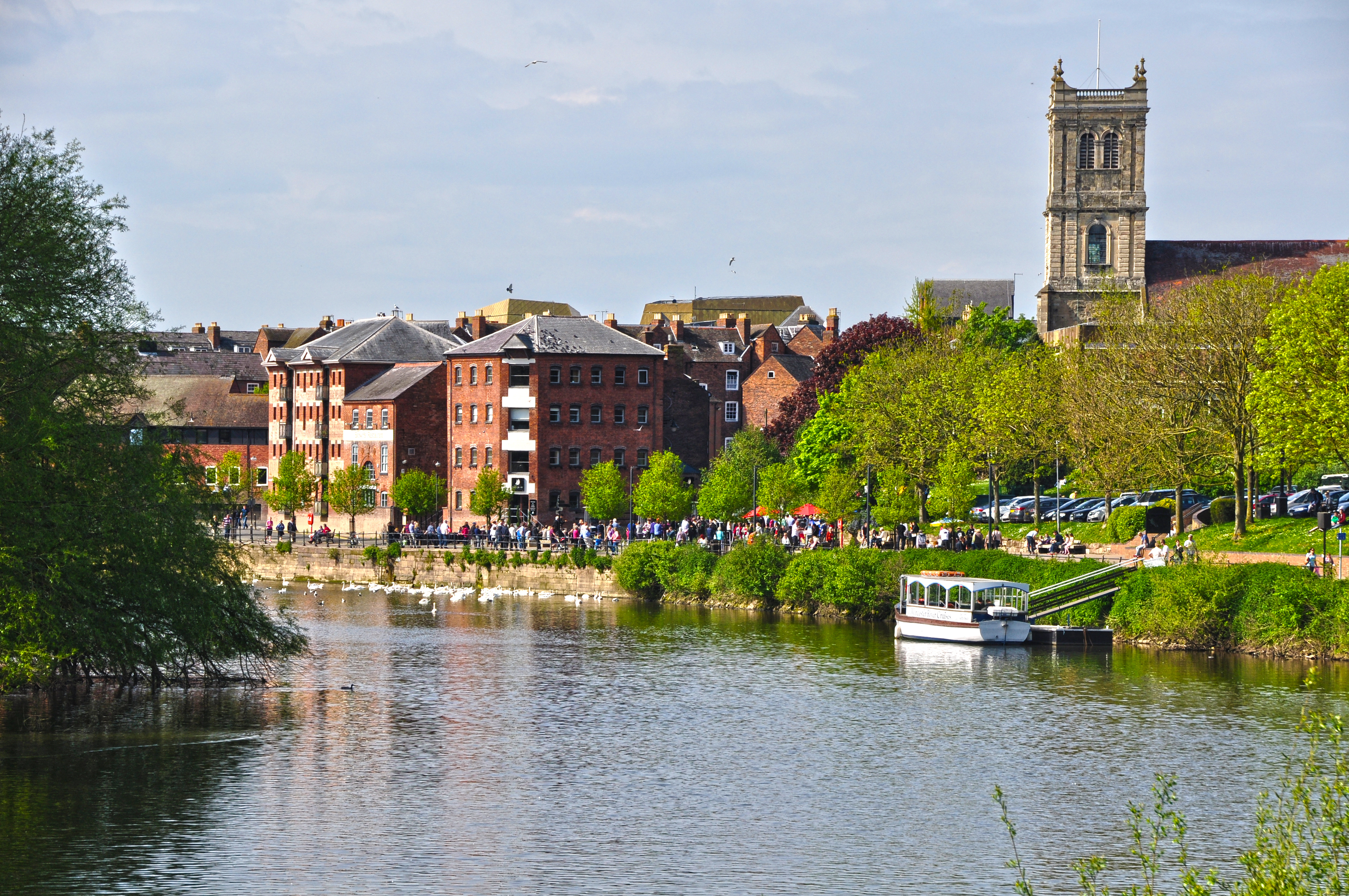
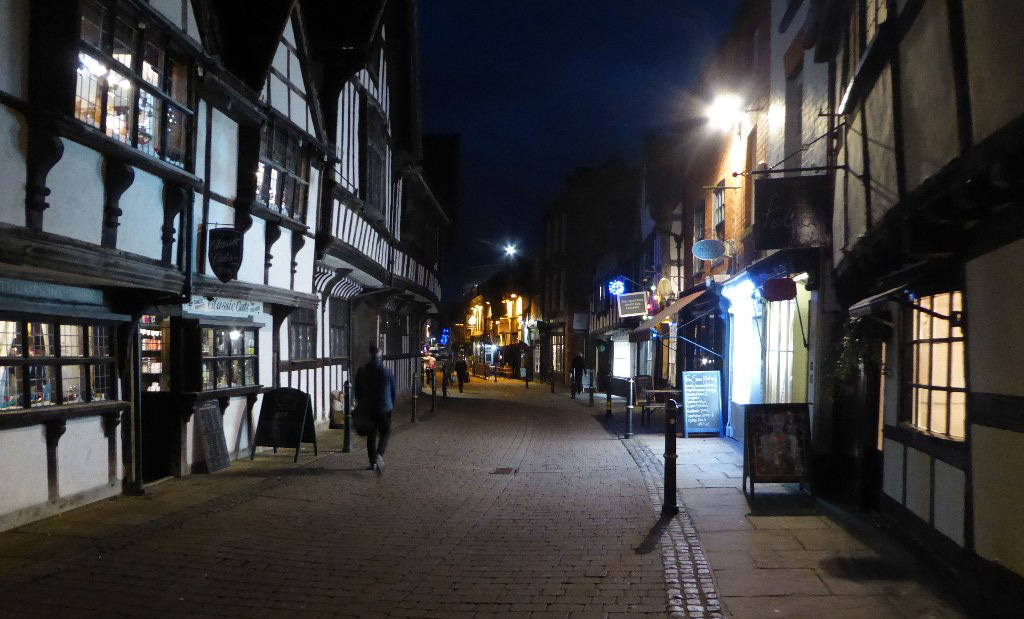
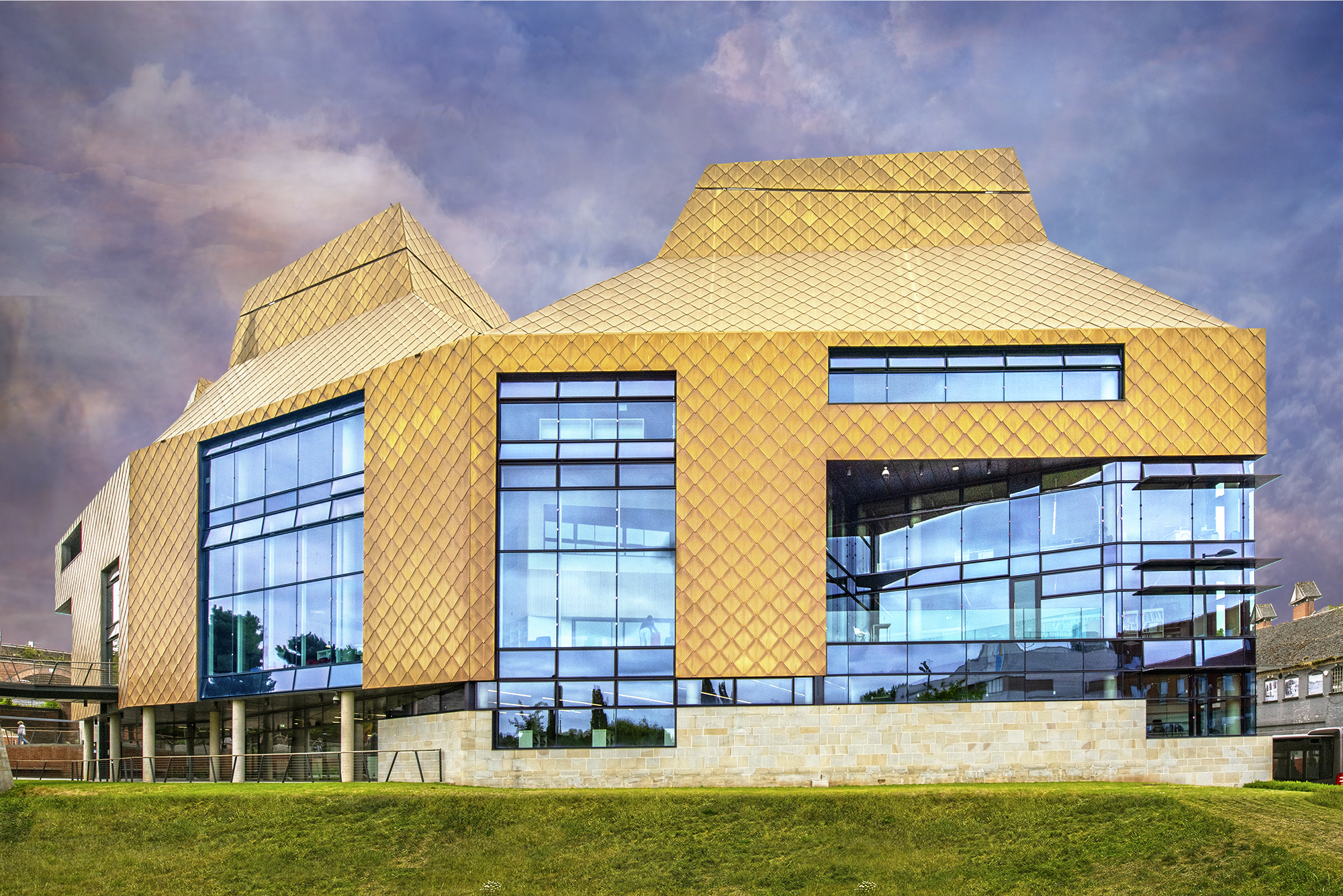
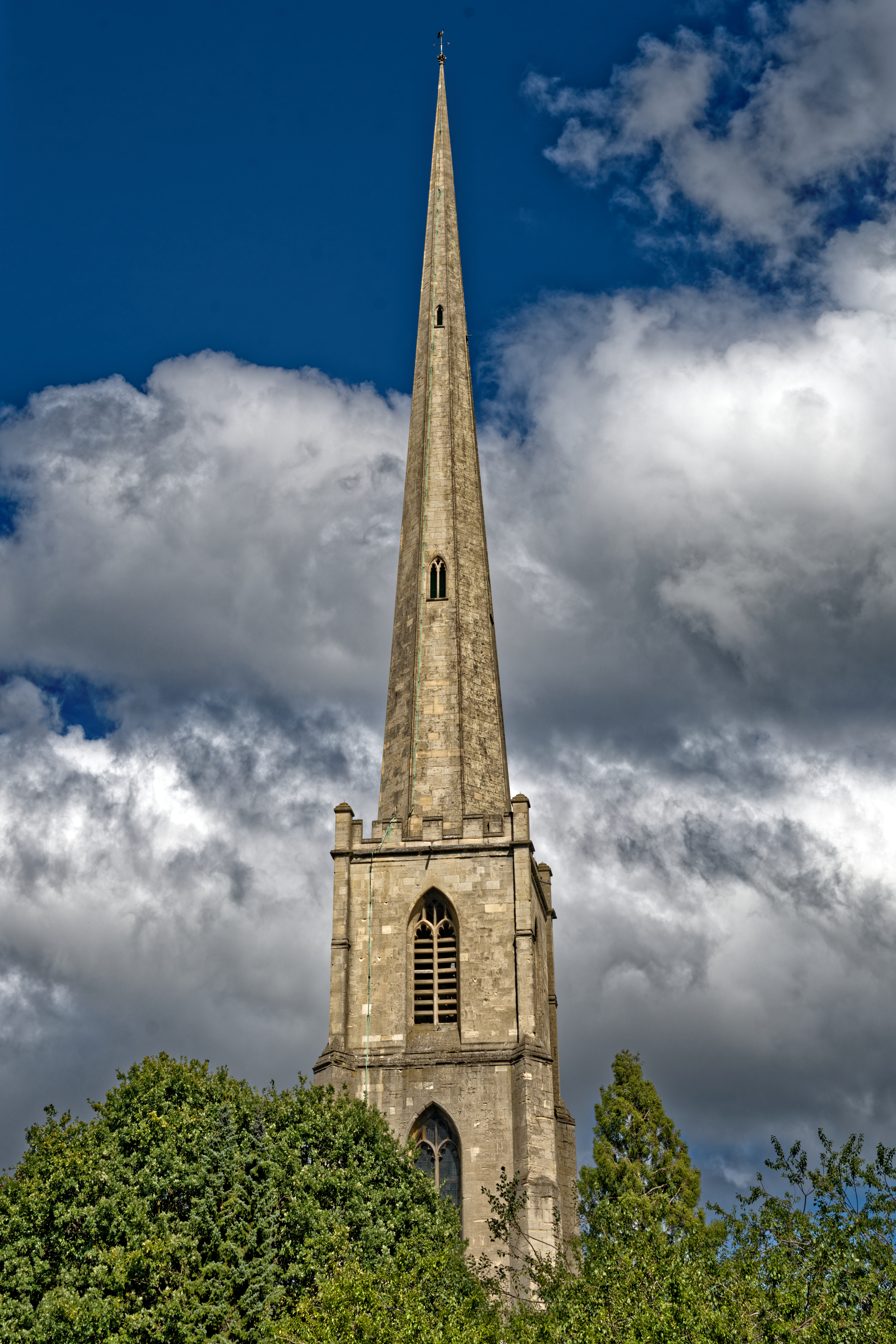
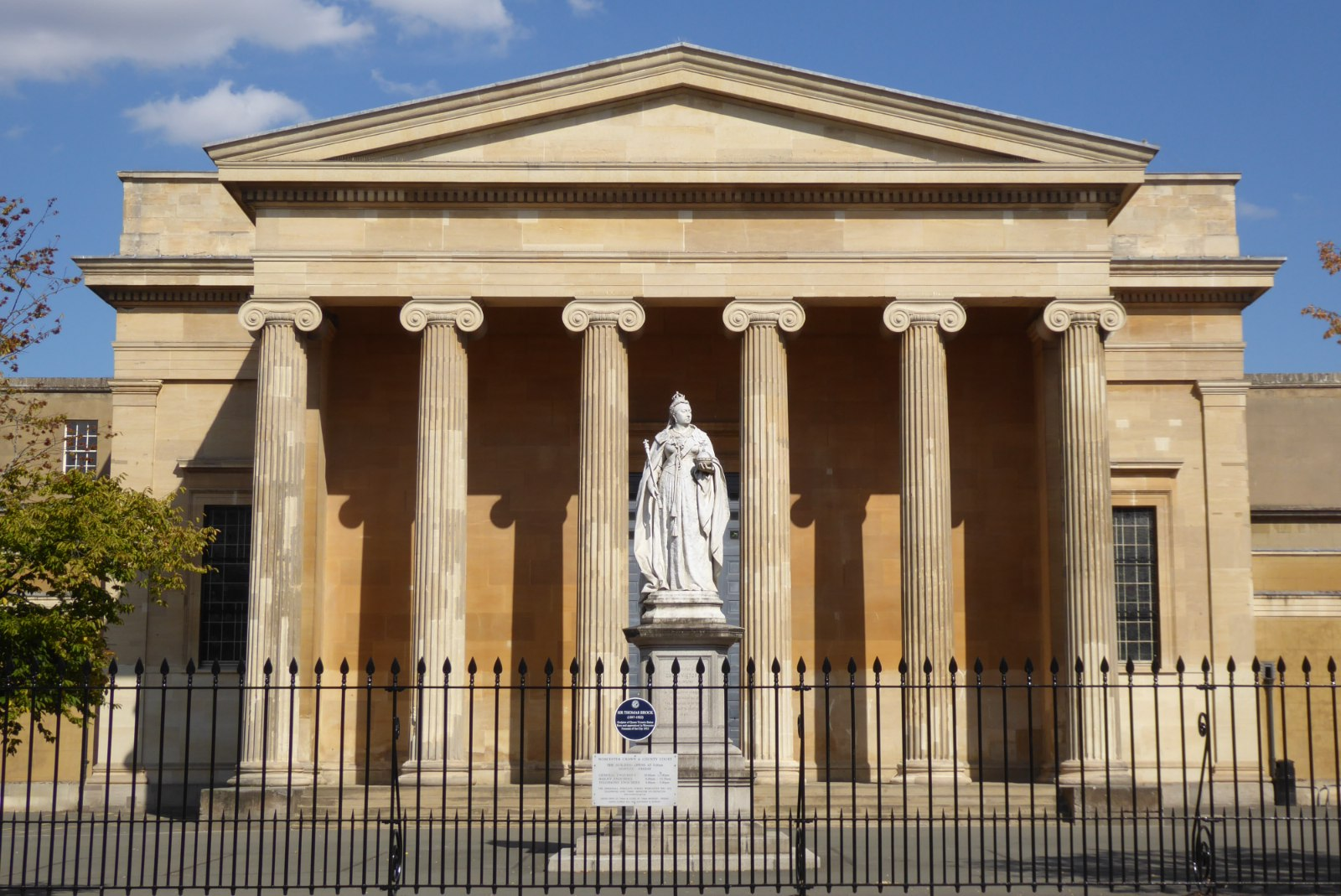
- Panoramic view from the river Friar Street The Hive Glover's Needle Shire Hall

- Coat of arms
- Nickname: The Faithful City
- Motto: Latin: Civitas in bello et pace fidelis, lit. ' A city faithful in peace and war'
- Worcester shown within Worcestershire
- Coordinates: 52°11′28″N 02°13′14″W
- Sovereign state: United Kingdom
- Country: England
- Region: West Midlands
- County: Worcestershire
- Roman Fortification: c. 1st century
- Anglo-Saxon Diocese Established: c. 680
- Legal city status: Time Immemorial
- Seat: The Guildhall, Worcester

Government
  - Type: Local authority
  - Body: Worcester City Council
  - Mayor: Tor Pingree (G)
  - Leader of the Council: Councillor Lynn Denham (L)
  - MP: Tom Collins (L)

Area
  - Total: 12.85 sq mi (33.28 km^{2})
  - Rank: 275th (of 296)

Population (2021 Census)
  - Total: 103,872
  - Rank: 231st (of 296)
  - Density: 8,084/sq mi (3,121/km^{2})
- Demonym: Vigornian

Ethnicity (2021)
  - Ethnic groups: List: 90% White; 5.6% Asian; 2.2% Mixed; 1.2% Black; 1% other

Religion (2021)
  - Religion: List: 48.9% Christianity; 39.6% no religion; 4.1% Islam; 0.4% Hinduism; 0.1% Judaism; 0.2% Sikhism; 0.4% Buddhism; 0.4% other; 6.1% not stated
- Time zone: UTC0 (GMT)
  - Summer (DST): UTC+1 (BST)
- Postcodes: WR1-5
- Area code: 01905
- ONS code: 47UE (ONS); E07000237 (GSS)
- OS grid reference: SO849548
- Website: worcester.gov.uk

Worcester (/ˈwʊstər/ WUUST-ər) is a cathedral city in Worcestershire, England, of which it is the county town. It is 30 mi (48 km) south-west of Birmingham, 27 mi (43 km) north of Gloucester, 23 mi (37 km) north-east of Hereford, and 50.8 mi (81 km) north-west of Oxford. The city is situated on the River Severn, 1.5 mi (2.4 km) north of the confluence with the River Teme. The population was 103,872 in the 2021 census.

The city has been a centre of education since the foundation of Worcester Cathedral in 680. It is home to The University of Worcester. It has been home to The King's School, Worcester since 1541, and The Royal Grammar School, Worcester traditionally since 685, reputedly making the latter the sixth oldest school in the world.

Worcester is famous for Worcestershire Sauce, traditionally made by Lea & Perrins, as well as for its former manufacturing of porcelain by Royal Worcester Porcelain, and its significant 19th century trade of glove making. It is home to Berrow's Worcester Journal, established in 1690, and claimed as the world's oldest newspaper in continuous and current publication.

The composer Edward Elgar (1857–1934) grew up in the city and spent much of his life in nearby Malvern.

Worcester was nicknamed 'The Faithful City' due to its status as a Royalist stronghold in the English Civil War, where it was host to the final battle of the war when Oliver Cromwell's New Model Army defeated the future Charles II's Royalists. It is the beginning of Charles II's escape route, now named the Monarch's Way; a 625 mi (1,006 km) public footpath following the route.

== Toponymy ==
The disputed first record of Worcester's name is the Latin Vertis, a latinisation of the Gaulish river-name Vigorna, from pre-Celtic Weogorena.

The earliest definitive record is the Latin Weogorna civitas (literally "City of the Weogoran"), a name which appears following the Anglo-Saxon settlement of Britain in an ecclesiastical charter of c. 691. The Anglo-Saxons interchangeably used Latin civitas and Old English caester (from Latin castrum, meaning fortress; the same root as English Chester). Anglo-Saxon forms slowly merged the two elements of Weogorna civitas into Wigranceastre (c. 717), Weogernaceastre (c. 884-901), and Wigracaestre (904).

Following the Norman conquest it was recorded in the Domesday Book (1086) as Wirecestre. This became Latin Wigornia in c. 12th century, Middle English Worcestre in c. 14th century, and Early Modern English Worcester in c. 15th century.

== History ==
=== Early history ===
A trade route past Worcester dating from Neolithic times became the Roman Icknield Street included a ford crossing the River Severn, which was tidal below Worcester, and around 400 BC linked Celtic built British hillforts. Evidence exists that Iron Age defensive ditches may have been constructed in the first century AD, while there are no signs of Roman military use or of municipal buildings to indicate an administrative role. By the 3rd century AD, Roman Worcester was larger than the later medieval city but shrank to a defended position on the river's southern end.

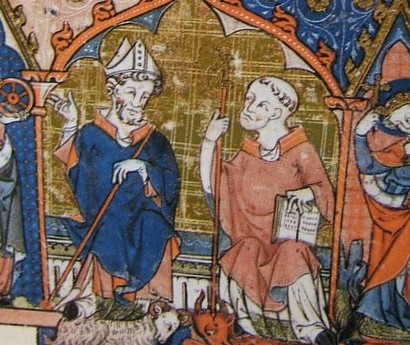
Oswald and Eadnoth

By the 7th century, following centuries of warfare with the Vikings, Worcester had become a centre for the Anglo-Saxon army. In 680, Worcester was chosen by the Hwicce as their fort over the larger Gloucester fort.

Following their conquest of England, in 1069 the Normans completed a Motte and Bailey castle just south of the cathedral on what had been a cemetery for the cathedral monks. Nothing now remains of the former Worcester Castle.

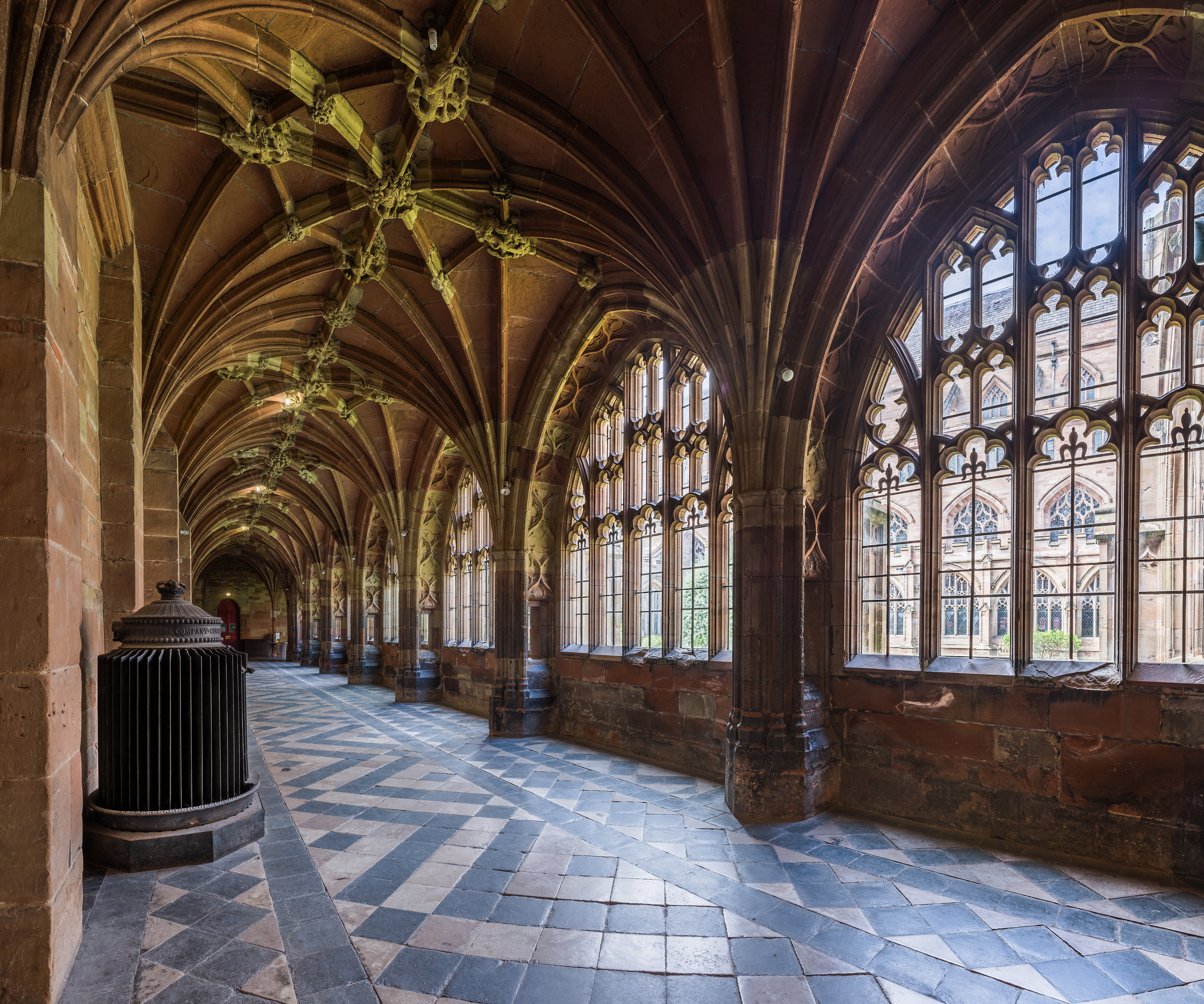
The medieval cloisters

During the early medieval period, Worcester's position as the only river crossing between the bridges at Gloucester and Bridgnorth led to its growth as a market town on the main road from London to mid-Wales running through to Kidderminster, Bridgnorth, and Shrewsbury. Worcester continued to be a centre of religious life. Several monasteries were established which provided a hospital and education, including Worcester School. Parts of the city were destroyed by fire during a civil war between King Stephen and Empress Matilda, daughter of Henry I in 1139, 1150 and 1151. A later fire in 1189 destroyed much of the city for the fourth time that century. In 1189 the city received a royal charter and in 1227 a further charter allowed the creation of a Gild Merchant.

The late 12th century saw persecution and expulsion of the small Jewish community of Worcester. The bishop of Worcester wrote an anti-Judaic treatise around 1190, and in 1219 strict rules were imposed on Jews within the diocese. In 1263 the Jews were attacked by baronial forces and most were killed. In 1275 the remaining Jews were expelled to Hereford.

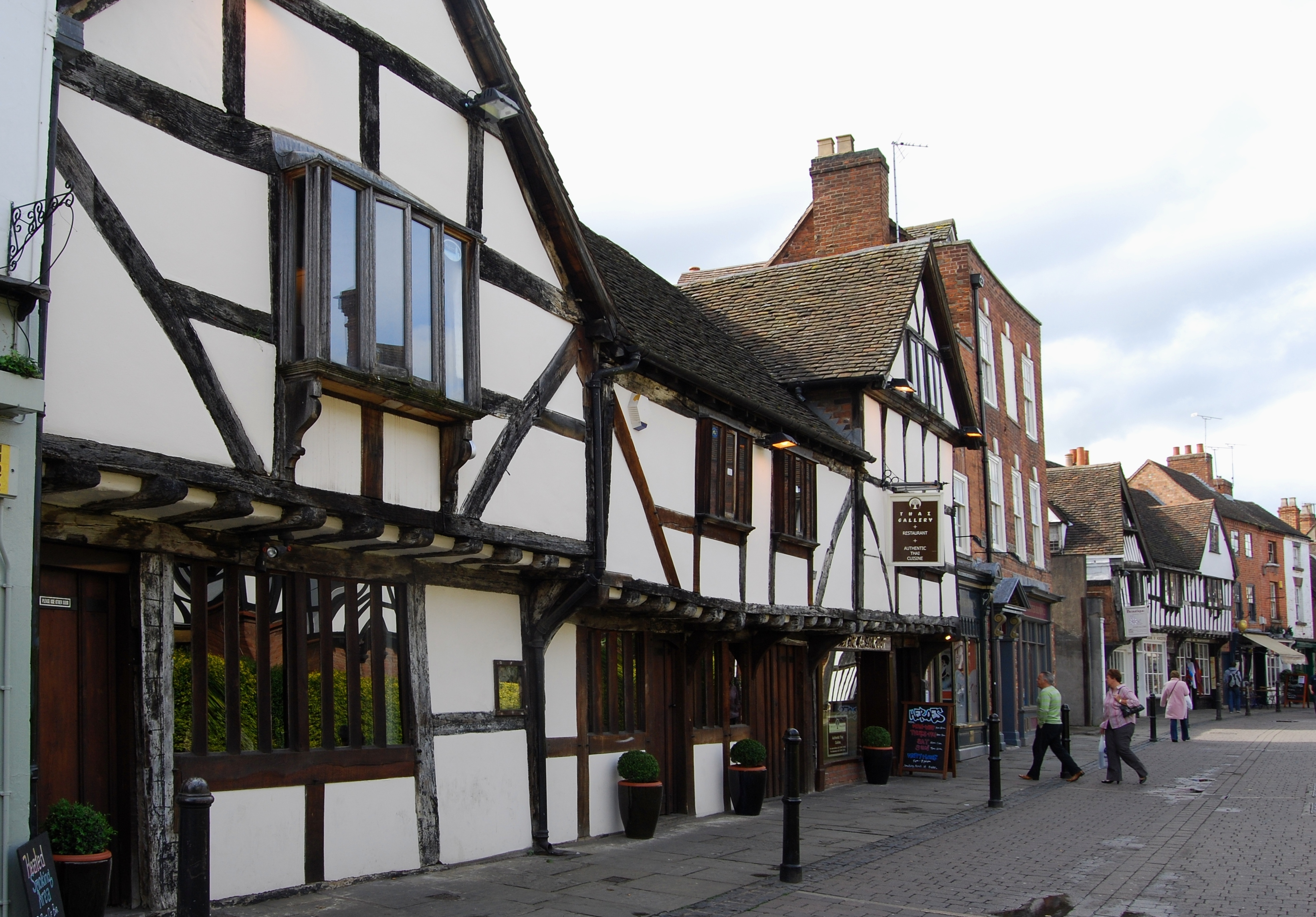
Tudor buildings in Friar Street

By late medieval times the population had reached 1,025 families, excluding the cathedral quarter, so that it probably stood under 10,000, and the suburbs extended beyond the city walls. Manufacture of cloth and allied trades developed into an important local industry. Worcester elected its Member of Parliament and the city council was organised into two chambers whose committees agreed the city's finances, rules and ordinances.

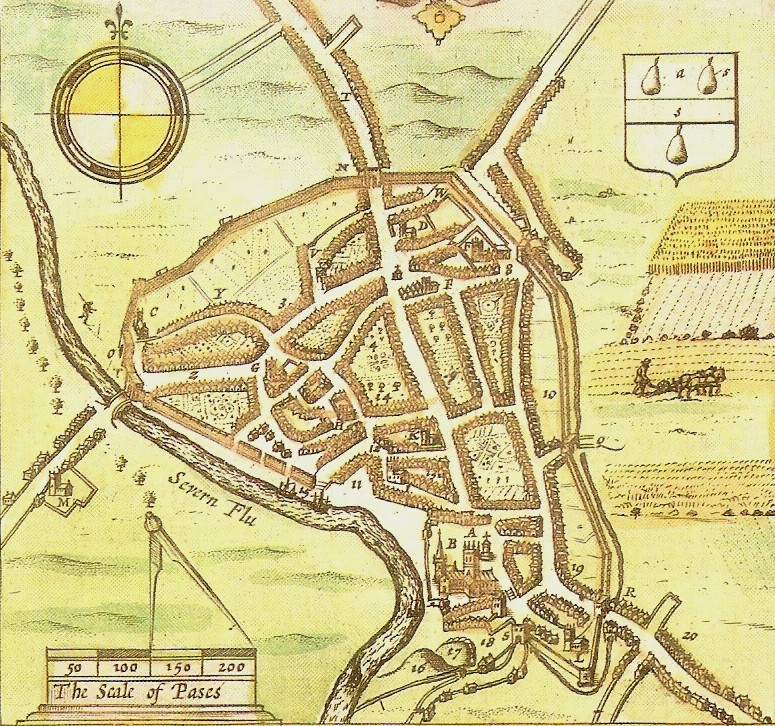
Worcester, 1610 map

The Dissolution of the monasteries by Henry VIII between 1536 and 1541, forced the city to found schools to replace monastic education. The city was designated a county corporate in 1621, giving it autonomy from local government and permitting governance by a mayor and co-opted councillors.

=== Modern era ===
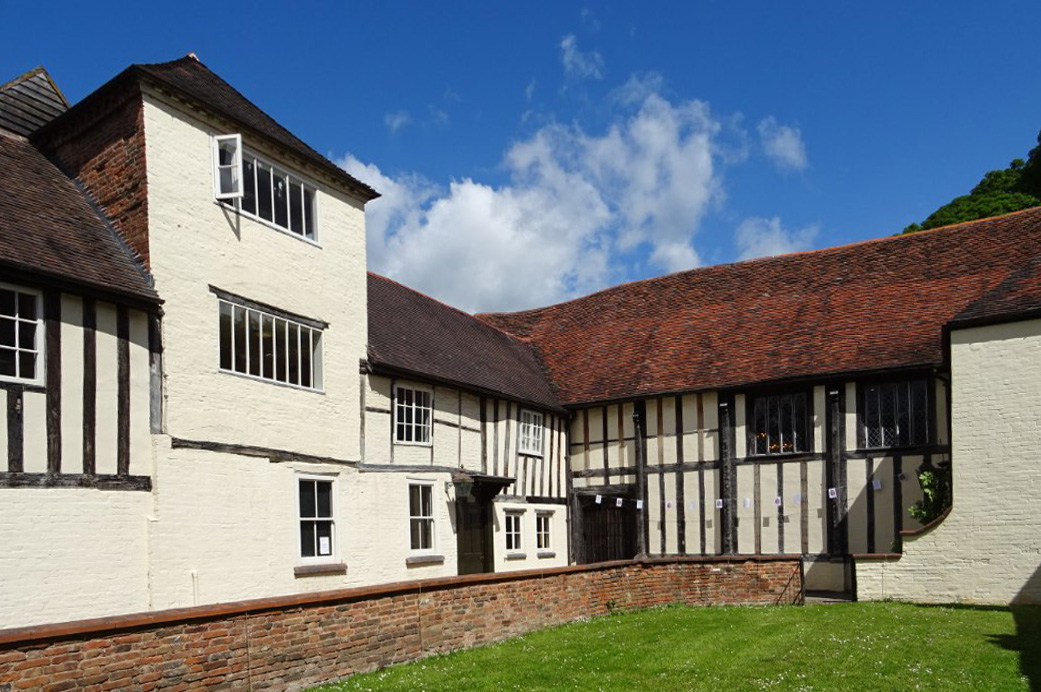
The Commandery, Royalist headquarters

The English Civil Wars broke out in 1642, lasting until 1651, and were marked with several major events in and around Worcester including the Battle of Powick Bridge of September 1642. The Battle of Worcester, the final conflict of the wars, was fought from the Royalist Headquarters at the Commandery but ended with a victory for the Oliver Cromwell forces of 30,000 men.

After the restoration of the monarchy in 1660, and during the 18th century Worcester experienced significant economic growth, and in 1748 Daniel Defoe could note that 'the inhabitants are generally esteemed rich, being full of business, occasioned chiefly by the clothing-trade'. The Royal Worcester Porcelain Company was established in 1751. However, significant poverty existed, and in 1794 a large workhouse was built at Tallow Hill. Worcester's Georgian architecture, has been described as 'one of the most impressive Georgian streetscapes in the Midlands'. Many public buildings were built or rebuilt in this period, including the Grade I listed Worcester Guildhall, the city bridge, and the Royal Infirmary (since 2010 the city campus of the University of Worcester).

The annual Three Choirs Festival and horse races on Pitchcroft attracts many visitors.

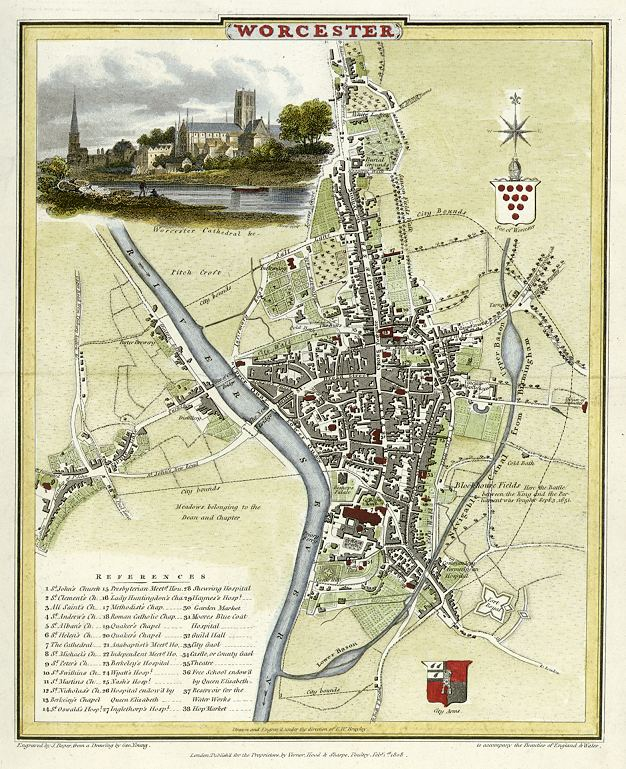
Map of Worcester in 1806

By the late 18th century Worcester's cloth industry had developed into a major centre for glove-making industry, employing around 30,000 people in the area at its peak employed by over 150 firms making half the gloves in Britain and with large worldwide exports. The industry had declined by the mid 20th century due to low import duty on foreign competitors and cheaper products. Surviving manufacturers concentrated on high-end fashionable goods with one company still making gloves for the Royal Family as of 2011. Riots took place in 1831 reflecting discontent with the city administration and the lack of democratic representation. Citizens petitioned the House of Lords for permission to build a County Hall. Local government reform took place in 1835 creating elections for councillors. The Shire Hall, which was designed by Charles Day and Henry Rowe in the Greek Revival style, was completed in 1835.

In 1815 the Worcester and Birmingham Canal opened. Railways reached Worcester in 1850 with Shrub Hill station and in 1860 when Foregate Street station was opened. The railways created many jobs building passenger coaches and signalling in the Worcester Engine Works alongside Shrub Hill Station. Their 1864 polychrome brick building was probably designed by Thomas Dickson.

The British Medical Association (BMA) was founded in 1832 in the board room of the old Worcester Royal Infirmary building in Castle Street.

The Kays was one of the most successful mail-order business in the UK and was founded in Worcester in 1889. It and operated from a large warehouse and many premises in the city where it remained as a major employer until 2007. The warehouse was demolished in 2008 and replaced by housing. In 1882 in the huge former railway factory alongside Shrub Hill station, the city hosted the Worcestershire Exhibition with sections for fine arts, historical manuscripts and industrial items, receiving over 222,000 visitors.

=== 20th century to present ===
The Foregate Street cast-iron railway bridge was remodelled by the Great Western Railway in 1908 with a decorative cast-iron exterior serving no structural purpose.

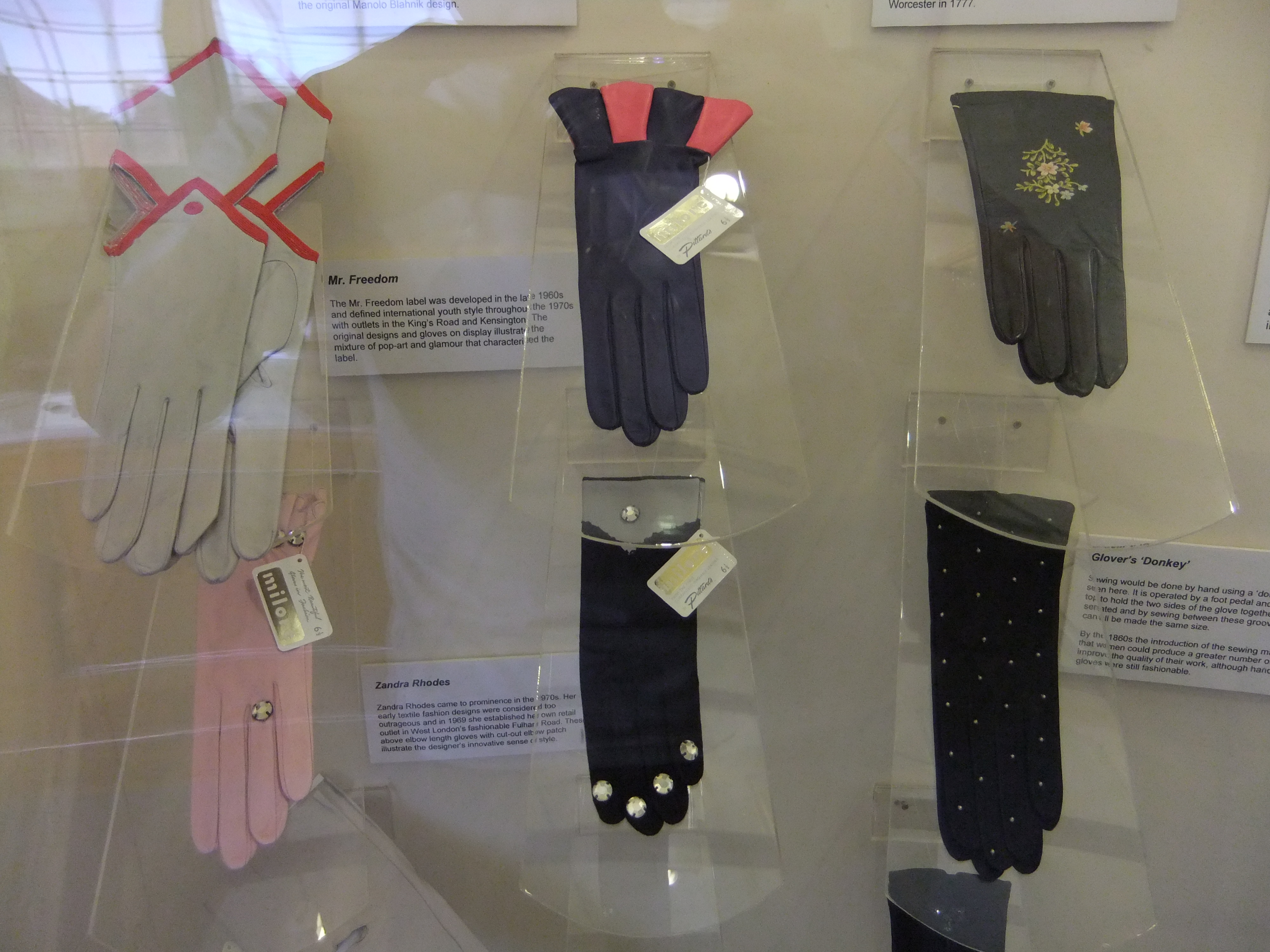
Gloves, Worcester City Art Gallery & Museum

By the mid-20th century, only a few Worcester glove firms survived, as gloves became less fashionable and free trade enabled cheaper imports from Eastern Asia. Nevertheless, at least three glove manufacturers survived into the late 20th century: Dent Allcroft, Fownes and Milore. In the 1940s, some Jewish refugees from Europe settled in Worcester. Emil Rich, a refugee from Germany, founded one of Worcester's last remaining glovemakers, Milore Glove Factory. Queen Elizabeth II's coronation gloves were designed by Emil Rich and manufactured in the Worcester factory.

Worcester was a centre for recruitment of soldiers to fight in World War I , into the Worcestershire Regiment, based at Norton Barracks. The regiment took part in early battles in the war, most notably at the Battle of Gheluvelt in 1914, which is commemorated by a park near the city centre.

Rapid growth in leading engineering and machine-tool manufacturing firms took place in the inter-war years and all became major employers in the city.

During World War II, the city was chosen to be the seat of The British Government if they evacuated London in case of mass German invasion. The War Cabinet, along with Winston Churchill and some 16,000 state workers, would have moved to Hindlip Hall (now part of the complex forming the Headquarters of West Mercia Police), 3 mi (4.8 km) north of Worcester. Nearby Madresfield Court was reserved for use as a refuge by the evacuating British Royal Family. The Perdiswell Aerodrome on the north-east edge of the city was the first municipal aerodrome in the world. It was the base for the former RAF station RAF Worcester and was an important pilot training and aircraft testing site during World War II .

In the 1950s and 1960s large areas of the medieval centre of Worcester were demolished and rebuilt. This was condemned by many such as Nikolaus Pevsner who described it as a "totally incomprehensible... act of self-mutilation". A significant area of medieval Worcester remains, with well-preserved examples of half-timbered Tudor houses in the shopping streets of City Walls Road, Friar Street and New Street.

== Governance ==
Worcester is administered by two tiers of local government: the non-metropolitan city district by Worcester City Council, and the non-metropolitan county level by Worcestershire County Council. The two civil parishes within the city of Warndon and St Peter the Great County, form a third tier of local government in those areas; the rest of the city is an unparished area. Worcester forms one of the six local government districts within the county.

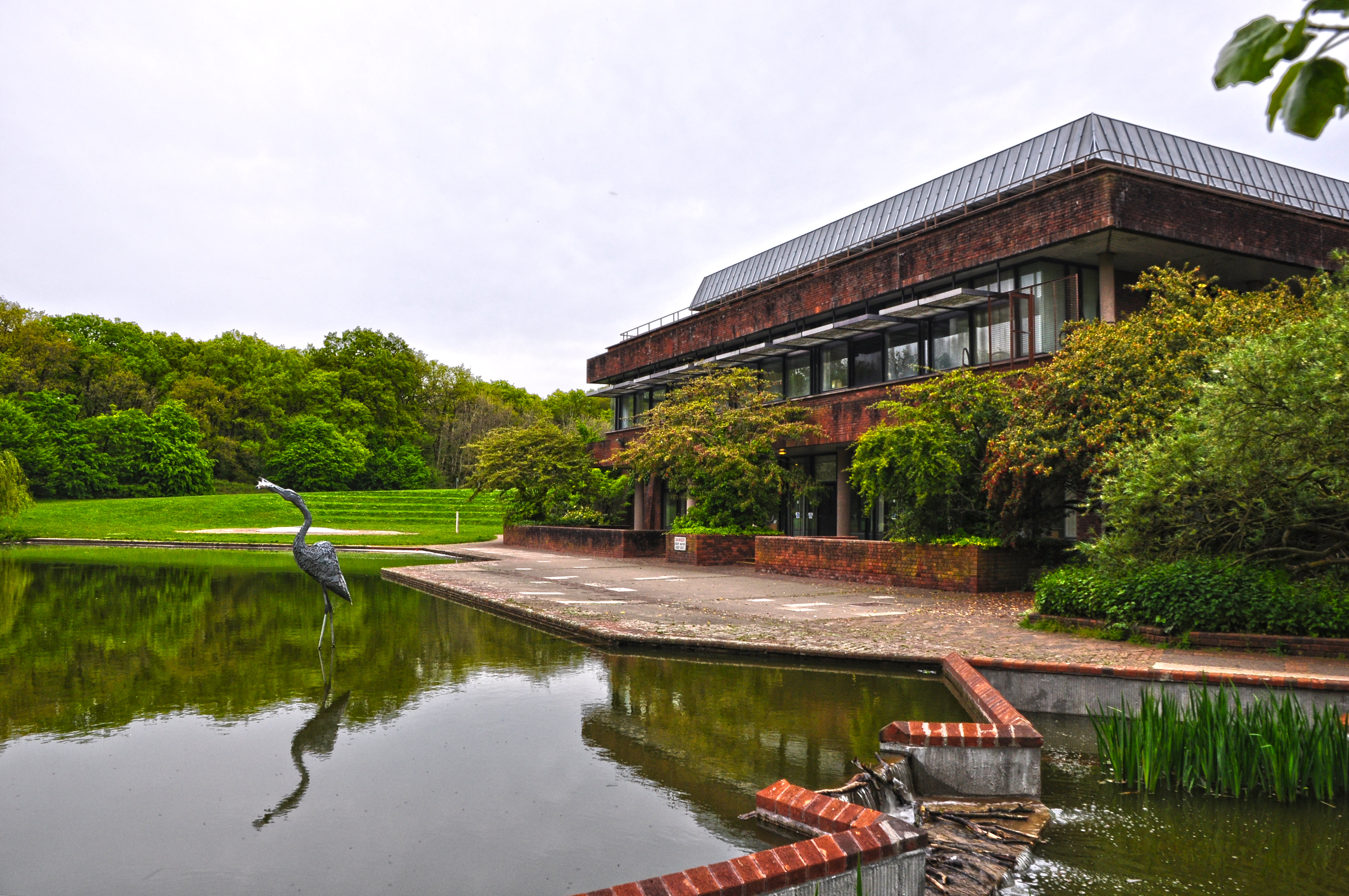
County Hall, headquarters of Worcestershire County Council

Worcester City Council is based at Worcester Guildhall on the High Street in the city centre. Worcestershire County Council also has its headquarters in Worcester, being based at County Hall in Spetchley Road, on the eastern outskirts of the city. Worcester was an ancient borough which had held city status from time immemorial. When elected county councils were established in 1889, the city was considered large enough to run its own county-level services and so it became a county borough, independent from the surrounding Worcestershire County Council.

The city was reformed to become a non-metropolitan district in 1974 under the Local Government Act 1972. The city's territory was enlarged to gaining the parishes of Warndon and St Peter the Great County, and it was transferred to the short-lived combined county of Hereford and Worcester, which was re-established as separate counties again in 1998, since which time the Worcestershire County Council has been the upper-tier authority for Worcester. The seat of Worcester's one constituency has been held by Tom Collins of the Labour Party since the July 2024 general election.

Under current local government reorganisation plans, all district councils in Worcestershire, as well as the county council, will be abolished in 2028, with Worcester forming part of a new South Worcestershire unitary authority, also including the area of the Wychavon and Malvern Hills districts. Worcester City Council, which will be abolished, is considering the establishment of a civil parish of Worcester, which would have a town (parish) council.

=== Coat of arms ===
The city of Worcester is unusual among English cities in having an arms of alliance as the main part of its coat of arms. The shield on the dexter side is the "ancient" arms: Quarterly sable and gules, a castle triple-towered argent. First recorded in 1569 but probably older, there is little doubt that it refers to the Worcester Castle, now vanished. The shield on the sinister side is the "modern" arms: Argent, a fess between three pears sable. Despite its name, the modern arms goes back to 1634. It is said to represent a visit of Queen Elizabeth I to the city in 1575, when according to folklore, she saw a tree with black pears on Foregate and was so impressed with it that she allowed Worcester to have pears on its coat of arms. The city has used several mottos: one is Floreat semper fidelis civitas, Latin for "Let the faithful city ever flourish", while the one currently used is Civitas in bello et pace fidelis (A city faithful in peace and war). Both refer to Worcester's support for Royalists in the English Civil War.

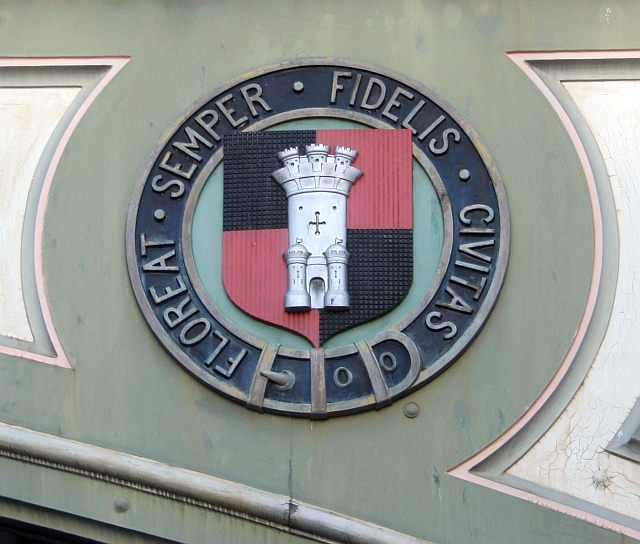
The "ancient" arms of the city on the railway bridge near Foregate Street station

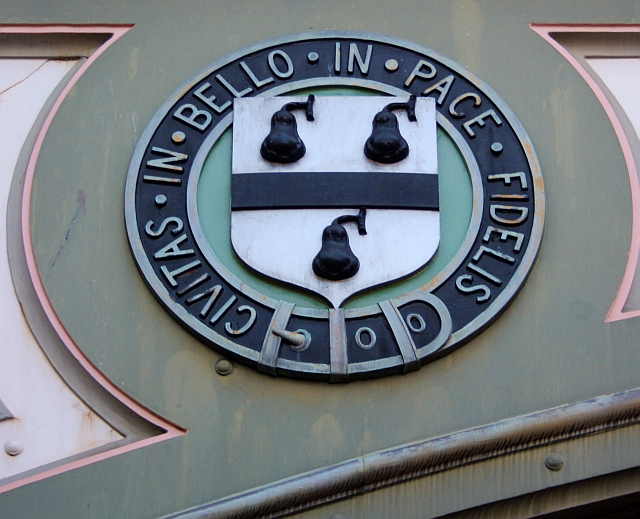
The "modern" arms of the city on the railway bridge near Foregate Street station

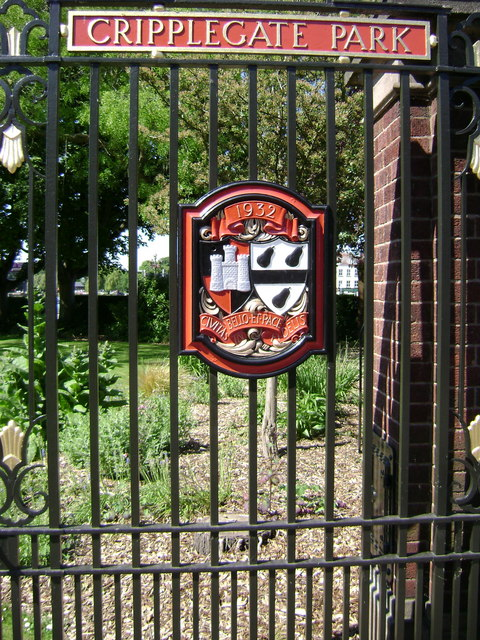
The coat of arms as shown on the entrance gate to Cripplegate Park

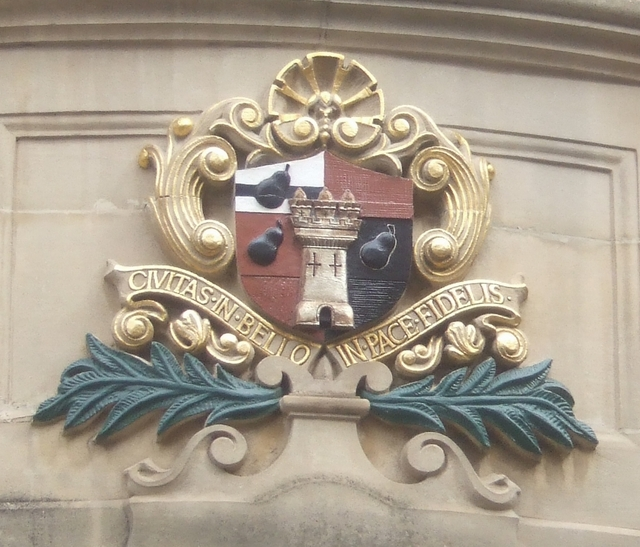
The coat of arms as shown in the Guildhall, with the "modern" placed over the "ancient"

== Geography ==
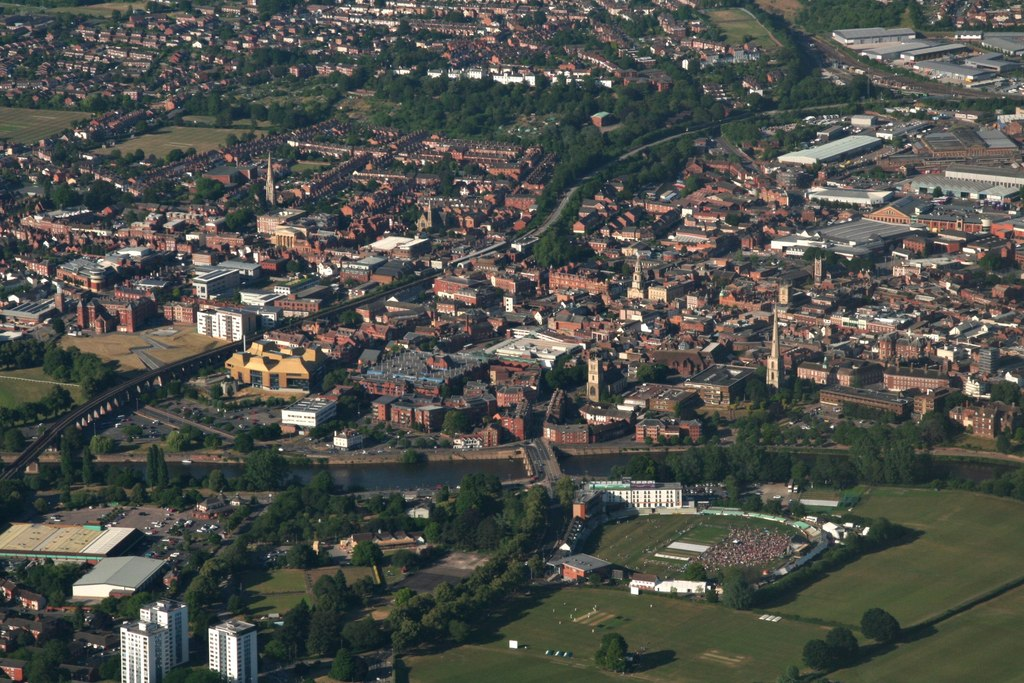
Aerial photograph of Worcester city centre

The district is bounded by the districts of Malvern Hills to the west, and Wychavon to the east. The population of the local government district in 2021 was 103,837. The built up area extends slightly beyond the city boundaries in places and had a population in 2021 of 105,465.

Notable suburbs include Barbourne, Blackpole, Cherry Orchard, Claines, Diglis, Dines Green, Henwick, Northwick, Red Hill, Ronkswood, St Peter the Great (also known as St Peter's), Tolladine, Warndon and Warndon Villages. Most of Worcester is on the eastern side of the River Severn. However, Henwick, Lower Wick, St John's and Dines Green are on the western side.

=== Climate ===
Worcester enjoys a temperate climate with generally warm summers and mild winters. However, it can experience more extreme weather and flooding is often a problem. In 1670, the River Severn burst its banks in the worst flood ever seen by the city. The closest flood height to the Flood of 1670 was when torrential rains caused the Severn to flood in July 2007, which is recorded in the Diglis Basin. This recurred in 2014.

During the winters of 2009–2010 and 2010–2011, the city underwent long periods of sub-freezing temperatures and heavy snowfalls. In December 2010 the temperature dropped to −19.5 °C (−3.1 °F) in nearby Pershore. The Severn and the River Teme partly froze over in Worcester during this cold period. By contrast, Worcester recorded a temperature 36.6 °C (97.9 °F) on 2 August 1990. Between 1990 and 2003, weather data for the area was collected at Barbourne, Worcester. Since the closure of this weather station, the nearest is located at Pershore.

Climate data for Pershore, (Note: Weather station is located 8.0 miles (12.9 km) from the Worcester city centre.) (1991–2020 normals, extremes 1957–present)
Month	Jan	Feb	Mar	Apr	May	Jun	Jul	Aug	Sep	Oct	Nov	Dec	Year
Record high °C (°F)	16.1 (61.0)	18.8 (65.8)	22.9 (73.2)	26.0 (78.8)	28.4 (83.1)	33.8 (92.8)	37.0 (98.6)	34.5 (94.1)	30.4 (86.7)	28.4 (83.1)	18.6 (65.5)	15.9 (60.6)	37.0 (98.6)
Mean daily maximum °C (°F)	7.9 (46.2)	8.7 (47.7)	11.2 (52.2)	14.2 (57.6)	17.4 (63.3)	20.4 (68.7)	22.6 (72.7)	22.1 (71.8)	19.3 (66.7)	15.0 (59.0)	10.8 (51.4)	8.2 (46.8)	14.8 (58.7)
Daily mean °C (°F)	4.8 (40.6)	5.1 (41.2)	7.0 (44.6)	9.3 (48.7)	12.4 (54.3)	15.3 (59.5)	17.4 (63.3)	17.1 (62.8)	14.6 (58.3)	11.1 (52.0)	7.4 (45.3)	5.0 (41.0)	10.5 (51.0)
Mean daily minimum °C (°F)	1.7 (35.1)	1.5 (34.7)	2.7 (36.9)	4.4 (39.9)	7.3 (45.1)	10.2 (50.4)	12.2 (54.0)	12.1 (53.8)	9.8 (49.6)	7.2 (45.0)	4.0 (39.2)	1.8 (35.2)	6.3 (43.3)
Record low °C (°F)	−16.6 (2.1)	−11.1 (12.0)	−10.1 (13.8)	−5.3 (22.5)	−3.2 (26.2)	−0.1 (31.8)	2.7 (36.9)	2.9 (37.2)	−0.6 (30.9)	−5.2 (22.6)	−10.5 (13.1)	−19.5 (−3.1)	−19.5 (−3.1)
Average precipitation mm (inches)	56.1 (2.21)	40.9 (1.61)	39.5 (1.56)	47.8 (1.88)	54.0 (2.13)	52.0 (2.05)	55.1 (2.17)	61.3 (2.41)	52.3 (2.06)	64.8 (2.55)	64.4 (2.54)	58.9 (2.32)	647.0 (25.47)
Average precipitation days (≥ 1.0 mm)	11.6	9.4	8.9	9.5	9.0	8.8	8.9	9.4	8.8	11.1	12.1	11.6	119.1
Mean monthly sunshine hours	57.0	77.3	120.5	163.0	204.8	200.8	209.4	187.4	142.6	104.0	67.7	48.9	1,583.1
Source 1: Met Office
Source 2: Starlings Roost Weather

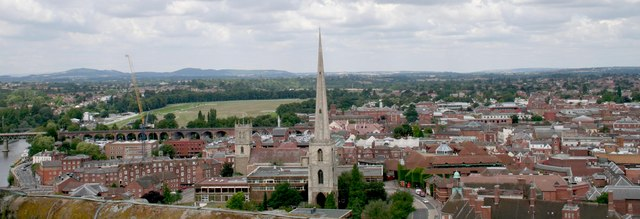
Skyline of Worcester viewed from Worcester Cathedral

=== Green belt ===
Worcester is in a regional green belt that extends into the surrounding counties. It is set to reduce urban sprawl between the cities and towns in the nearby West Midlands conurbations centred round Birmingham and Coventry, to discourage further convergence, protect the identity of outlying communities, encourage brownfield reuse, and preserve nearby countryside. This is done by restricting inappropriate development within the designated areas and imposing strict conditions on permitted building.

Within the city boundary, there is a small area of green belt north of the Worcester and Birmingham canal and of the Perdiswell and Northwick suburbs. This is part of a larger isolated tract south of the main green belt that extends into the adjacent Wychavon district, minimising urban sprawl between Fernhill Heath and Droitwich Spa, and keeping them separate. The green belt was first drawn up under Worcestershire County Council in 1975; the size within the borough in 2017 amounted to some 240 ha (2.4 km^{2}; 0.93 sq mi).

== Demography and religion ==
The 2011 census put Worcester's population at 98,768. About 93.4 per cent were classed as white, of whom 89.1 percentage points were White British – higher than the national average. The largest religious group consisted of Christians, with 63.7 per cent of the city's population. Those reporting no religion or declining to state an allegiance made up 32.3 per cent. The next largest religious group, Muslims, made up 2.9 per cent. Ethnic minorities included people of Pakistani, Bangladeshi, Chinese, Indian, Italian and Polish origin, the largest single group being British Pakistanis, numbering around 1,900: 1.95 per cent of the population. This has led to Worcester containing a small but diverse range of religious groups; as well as the prominent Anglican Worcester Cathedral, there are also Catholic, United Reformed and Baptist churches, a large centre for the Church of Jesus Christ of Latter-day Saints, a small number of Islamic mosques and a number of smaller groups for oriental religions such as Buddhism and the International Society for Krishna Consciousness.

Worcester is the seat of a Church of England bishop, whose official signature is the personal Christian name followed by Wigorn. (abbreviating the Latin Wigorniensis, meaning of Worcester). This is also used occasionally to abbreviate the name of the county. The previous Archdeacon of Worcester, Robert Jones, inducted in November 2014, had been Rector of St Barnabas with Christ Church in Worcester for eight years. He retired on 30 November 2023.

== Economy ==
=== Manufacturing ===
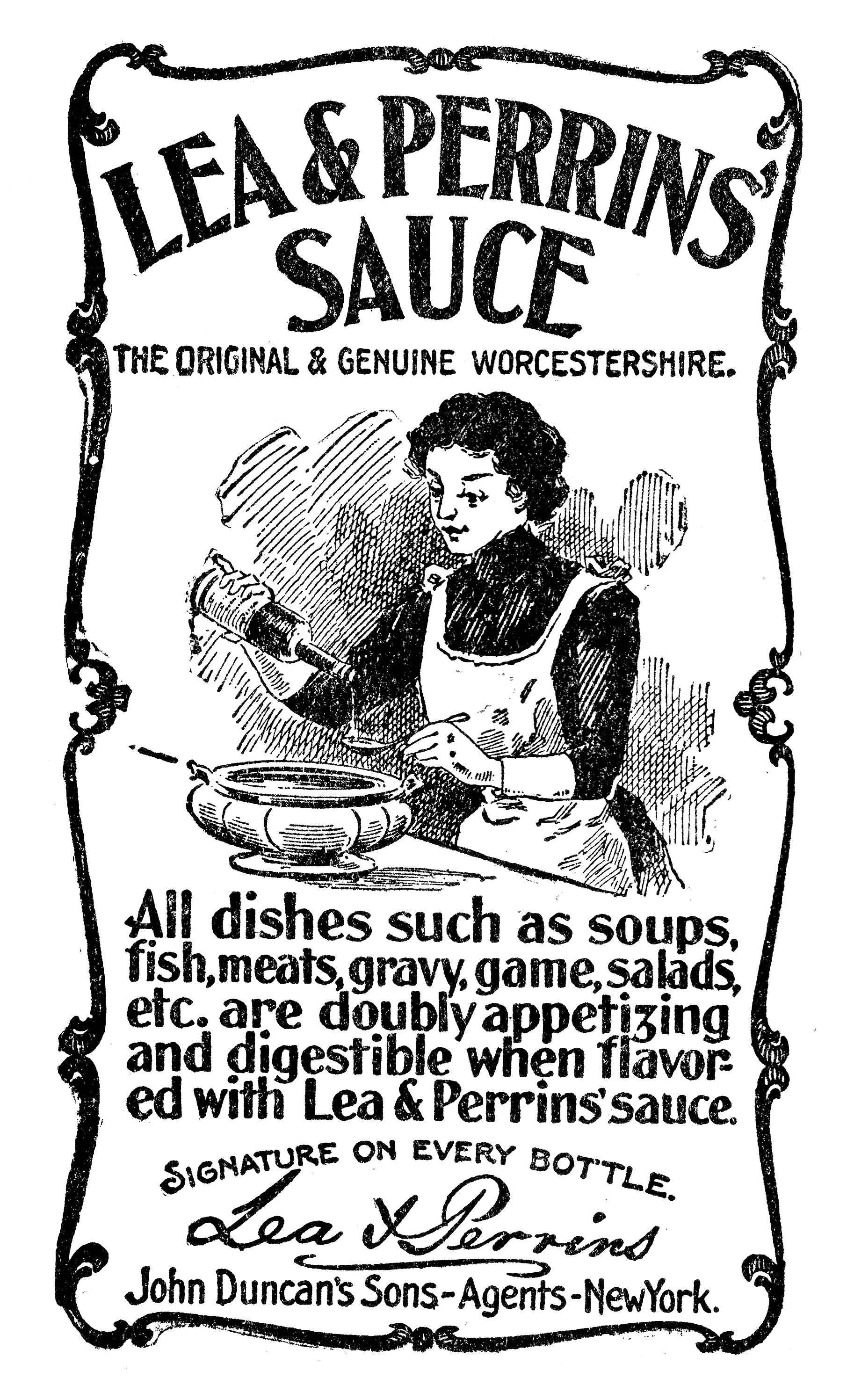
Lea & Perrins advertisement (1900)

One of Worcester's famous products, Lea & Perrins Worcestershire sauce, is made and bottled at a Midland Road factory, its home since 16 October 1897. Lea and Perrins originally partnered a chemist's shop on the site of the Debenhams's store in Crowngate Shopping Centre. Worcester has what is claimed to be the oldest newspaper in the world still in publication: Berrow's Worcester Journal. It traces its descent from a news-sheet started in 1690.

The foundry heritage of the city is represented by Morganite Crucible at Norton which produces graphitic shaped products and cements for use in the modern industry. The city is home to the European manufacturing plant of Yamazaki Mazak Corporation, a global Japanese machine tool builder established here in 1980. Worcester Heating Systems was started in the city in 1962 by Cecil Duckworth. The company was bought by Bosch and renamed Worcester Bosch in 1996.

=== Retail trade ===
The city is a major retail centre, with several covered shopping centres to accommodate the major chains and many independent shops and restaurants, particularly in Friar Street and New Street. Worcester's main shopping centre is the High Street, with several major retail chains. The High Street was controversially part-modernised in 2005, and further modernised in 2015; with current redevelopment of Cathedral Plaza and Lychgate Shopping Centre. Much of the protest came at the felling of old trees, the duration of the work (caused by weather and an archaeological find) and removal of flagstones outside the city's 18th-century Guildhall. The other main thoroughfares are the Shambles and Broad Street. The Cross and its immediate surrounding area are the city's financial centre for most of Worcester's main bank branches.

CrownGate Shopping Centre, Cathedral Plaza and Reindeer Court are the three main covered shopping centres in the city centre and immediately east of the city centre is the unenclosed shopping area of Shrub Hill Retail Park in the St Martin's Quarter. The inner suburb shopping centres, the Elgar and Blackpole retail parks are located in the Blackpole district and include many nation-wide retail chains.

== Amenities and landmarks ==
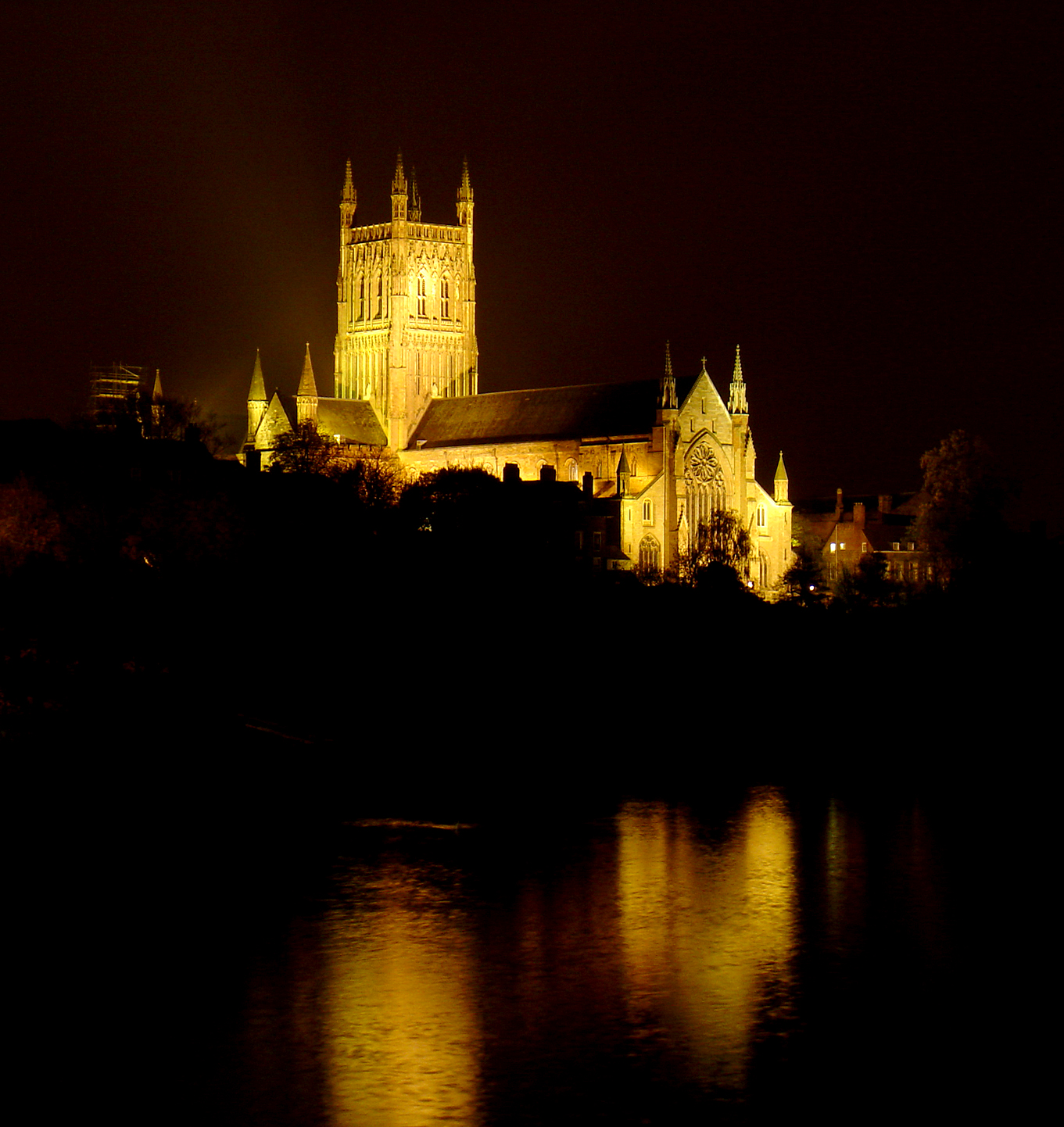
Worcester Cathedral at night

The most famous landmark in Worcester is the Anglican Worcester Cathedral. Officially the Cathedral Church of Christ and the Blessed Virgin Mary, it was known as Worcester Priory before the English Reformation. Construction began in 1084. Its crypt dates from the 11th century. It includes the only circular chapter house in the country. It houses the tombs of King John and Prince Arthur. Near the cathedral is the spire of St Andrew's Church, which is all that remains after the church was demolished in 1949 due to safety concerns. Known as Glover's Needle from the city's association with the glove-making industry, it has the steepest church spire in the UK. The Parish Church of St Helen, on the north side of the High Street, is mainly medieval, with a west tower rebuilt in 1813. The east end, re-fenestration and porch were completed by Frederick Preedy in 1857–1863. There was further restoration, by Aston Webb in 1879–1880. It is a Grade II* listed building.

The high-water marks from the flood of 1670 and more recent flood levels are shown on a brass plate on a wall adjacent to the path along the river that leads to the cathedral.

Museums include Worcester City Art Gallery and Museum, Greyfriars' House, the Infirmary Museum, Tudor House Museum, George Marshall Medical Museum, RAF Defford Museum, Museum of Royal Worcester, Mercian Regiment Museum, the Commandery, and Worcestershire Yeomanry Museum. The Battle of Worcester site is just south of the city. Limited parts of Worcester's city wall remain.

The Hive, on the north side of the River Severn at the former cattle market site, is Worcester's joint public and university library and archive centre, heralded as "the first of its kind in Europe", and a prominent feature on the skyline. With seven towers and a golden rooftop, it has gained recognition, winning two international awards for building design and sustainability.

The city's main three open spaces are Gheluvelt Park in the Barbourne inner-city suburb, Fort Royal Park in the south-east of the city and Cripplegate Park, located near the Worcester Bridge, adjacent to the Worcester County Cricket ground. The large Gheluvelt Park commemorates the part played by Worcestershire Regiment's 2nd Battalion in the Battle of Gheluvelt in the First World War; Fort Royal Park being the site of the last battle of the English Civil War in 1651. An additional large area known as Pitchcroft close to the city centre on the east bank of the River Severn next to the railway viaduct, is an open 100 acres (40 hectares) public space except on days when it is used for horse racing.

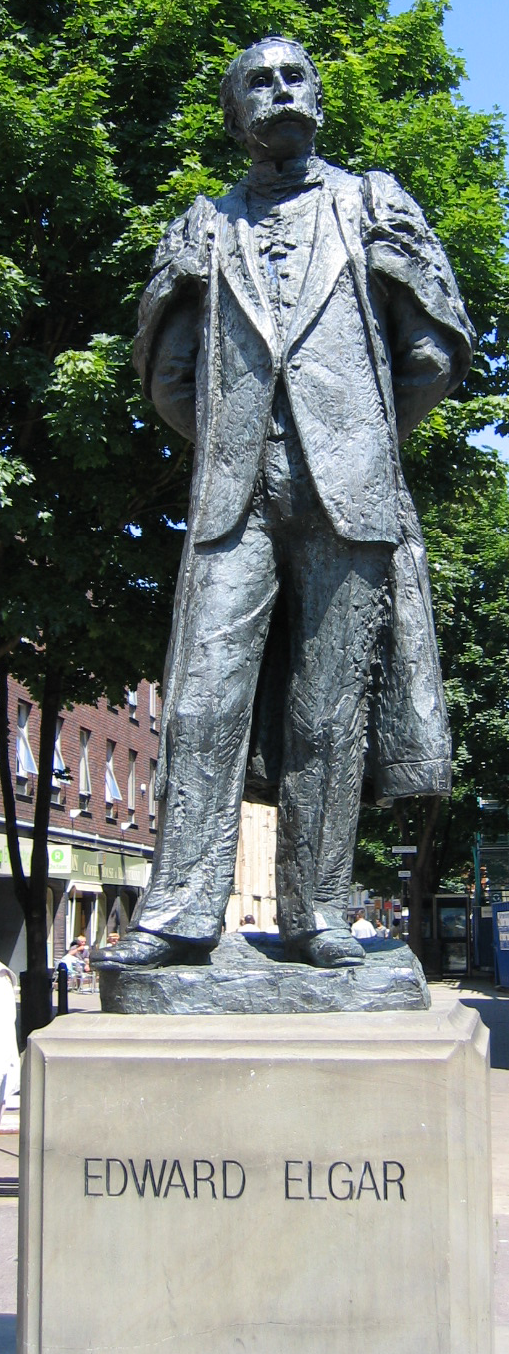
Statue of Edward Elgar

A statue of the composer Edward Elgar, commissioned from Kenneth Potts and unveiled in 1981, stands at the end of Worcester High Street facing the cathedral, a few metres from the original location of his father's music shop which was demolished in the 1960s. Elgar's birthplace was the nearby village of Broadheath. Plaques installed in the city include a dedication to the medieval Jewish community at Copenhagen Street.

The city has two large wooded areas: Perry Wood 12 hectares (30 acres) and Nunnery Wood 21 hectares (52 acres). Perry Wood is often said to be where Oliver Cromwell met and made a pact with the Devil. Nunnery Wood is integral to the adjacent Worcester Woods Country Park, which is adjacent to the County Hall on the east side of the city.

== Transport ==
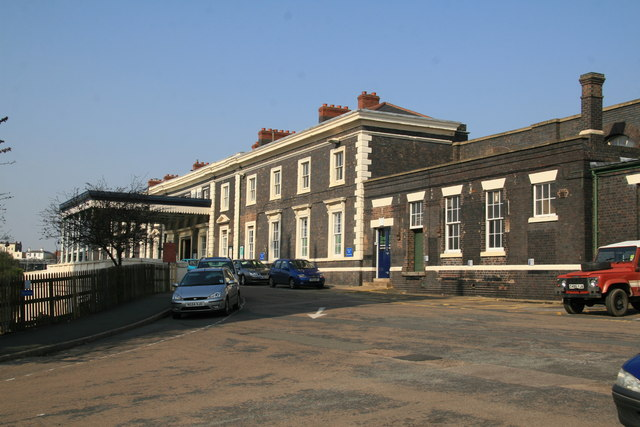
Worcester Shrub Hill railway station

=== Road ===
The M5 Motorway runs north–south immediately to the east of the city. It is accessed by junction 6 (Worcester North) and junction 7 (Worcester South). It connects Worcester to most parts of the country, including London, which is only 118 mi (190 km) using the A44 scenic route via the Cotswolds and M40. A faster journey to London but with an increased distance of 134 mi (216 km) goes via the M5, M42 and M40 motorways.

The main roads through the city include the A449 road south-west to Malvern and north to Kidderminster. The A44 runs south-east to Evesham and west to Leominster and Aberystwyth and crosses Worcester Bridge. The A38 trunk road runs south to Tewkesbury and Gloucester and north-north-east to Droitwich and Bromsgrove and Birmingham. The A4103 goes west-south-west to Hereford. The A422 heads east to Alcester, branching from the A44 a mile east of the M5. The city is partly ringed by A4440.

Carrington Bridge on the A4440 is the second road bridge across the Severn. Opened on 20 April 1985 after decades of pressure for a second bridge to relieve traffic over the narrow city centre bridge, it links the A38 from Worcester towards Gloucester with the A449 to Malvern. It is one of Worcestershire's busiest roads. The single-carriageway bridge was doubled with work being completed on 5 August 2022, making the Southern Link Road dual between junction 7 of the M5 and Powick Roundabout. As of 2025 it remains the only river crossing in the 10 mi (16 km) between Worcester and Upton-upon-Severn.

=== Rail ===
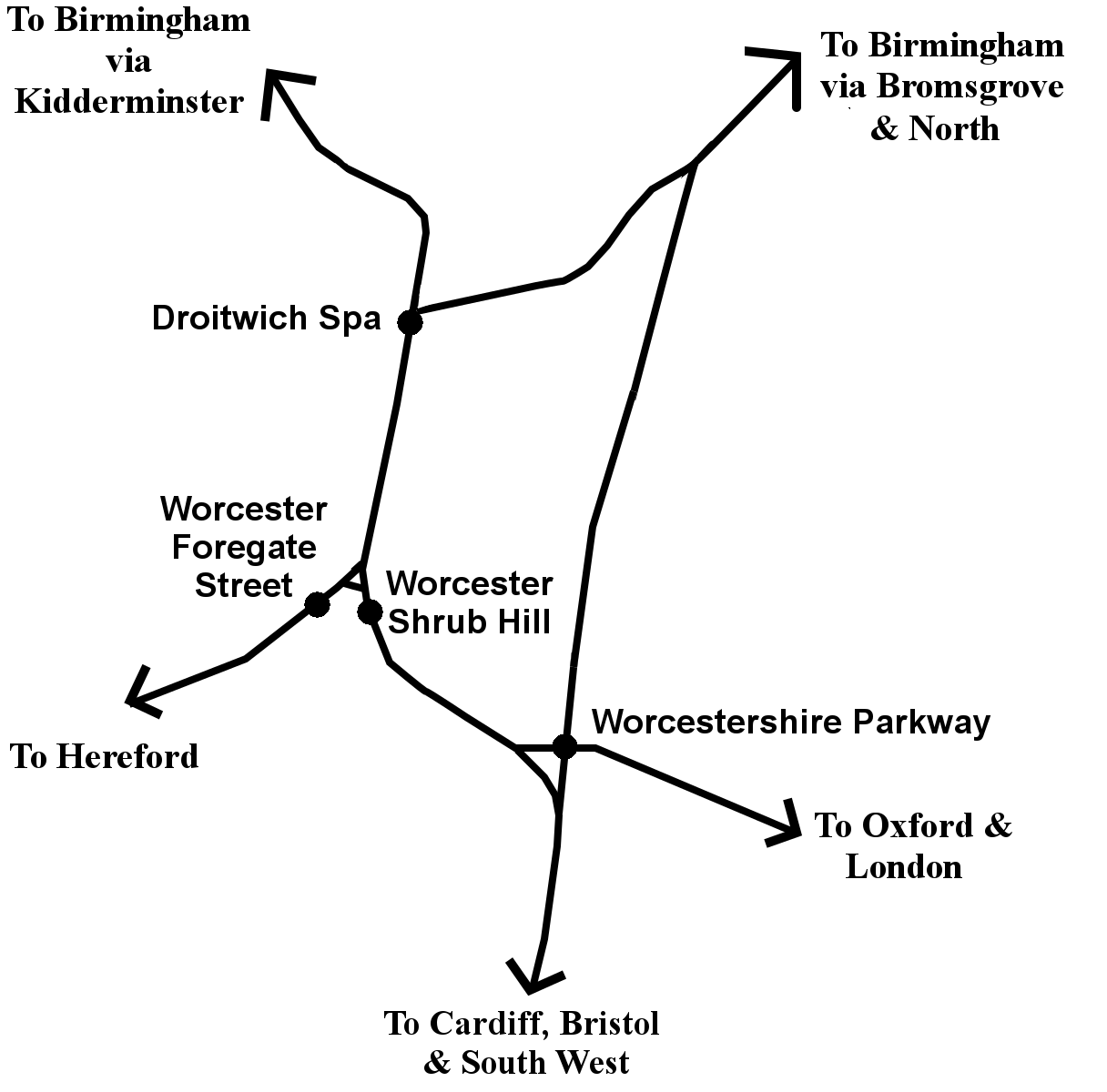
Map of railways around Worcester, showing location of stations

Worcester is served by three stations. Worcester Foregate Street is in the middle of the city centre, Worcester Shrub Hill is located just over 0.5 miles (0.80 km) to the east, and Worcestershire Parkway which opened in 2020 is located 4.5 miles (7.2 km) the south-east of the city centre. Together, they serve all stations in the county and have frequent trains to Birmingham and the North, Oxford and London (Paddington), Malvern and Hereford, and Cardiff, Bristol, and the West Country.

=== Buses ===
The main operator in and around the city is First Midland Red. A few smaller operators provide services in Worcester, including Astons, DRM and LMS Travel. Diamond Bus operates a service from Kidderminster to communities along the A449. The terminus and interchange for many bus services is Crowngate bus station in the city centre.

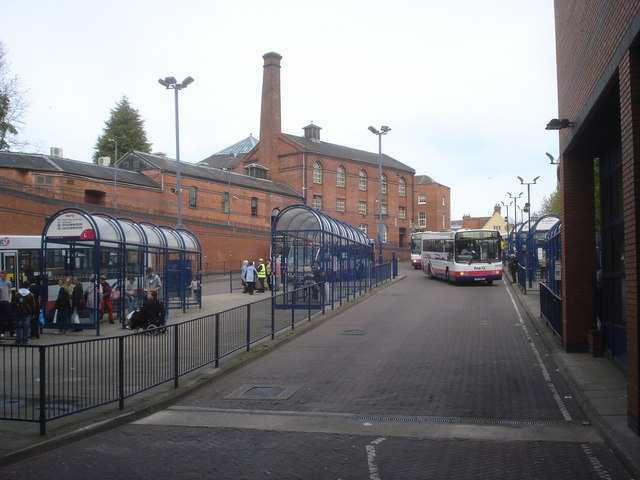
Worcester Crowngate bus station

The city had two park and ride sites: off the A38 in Perdiswell and at Sixways Stadium next to the M5. Worcestershire County Council voted to close both in 2014 as part of a package of cutbacks. The service at Sixways Stadium has since been reinstated, with LMS Travel operating the W3 route to Worcestershire Royal Hospital, but avoiding the city centre bus station.

=== Air ===
Worcester's nearest airport is Birmingham International 35 miles (56 km) away, which is accessible by motorway (40 minutes) and rail from via Birmingham New Street station where trains leave every few minutes (202 trains per day) taking 10 – 12 minutes direct to the airport on the Birmingham - London line. Gloucestershire Airport in Staverton at about 24 miles (39 km) away at 29 minutes by motorway is the busiest general aviation airport in the UK for business and private charter, flying clubs, and private and commercial pilot training.

=== Cycling ===
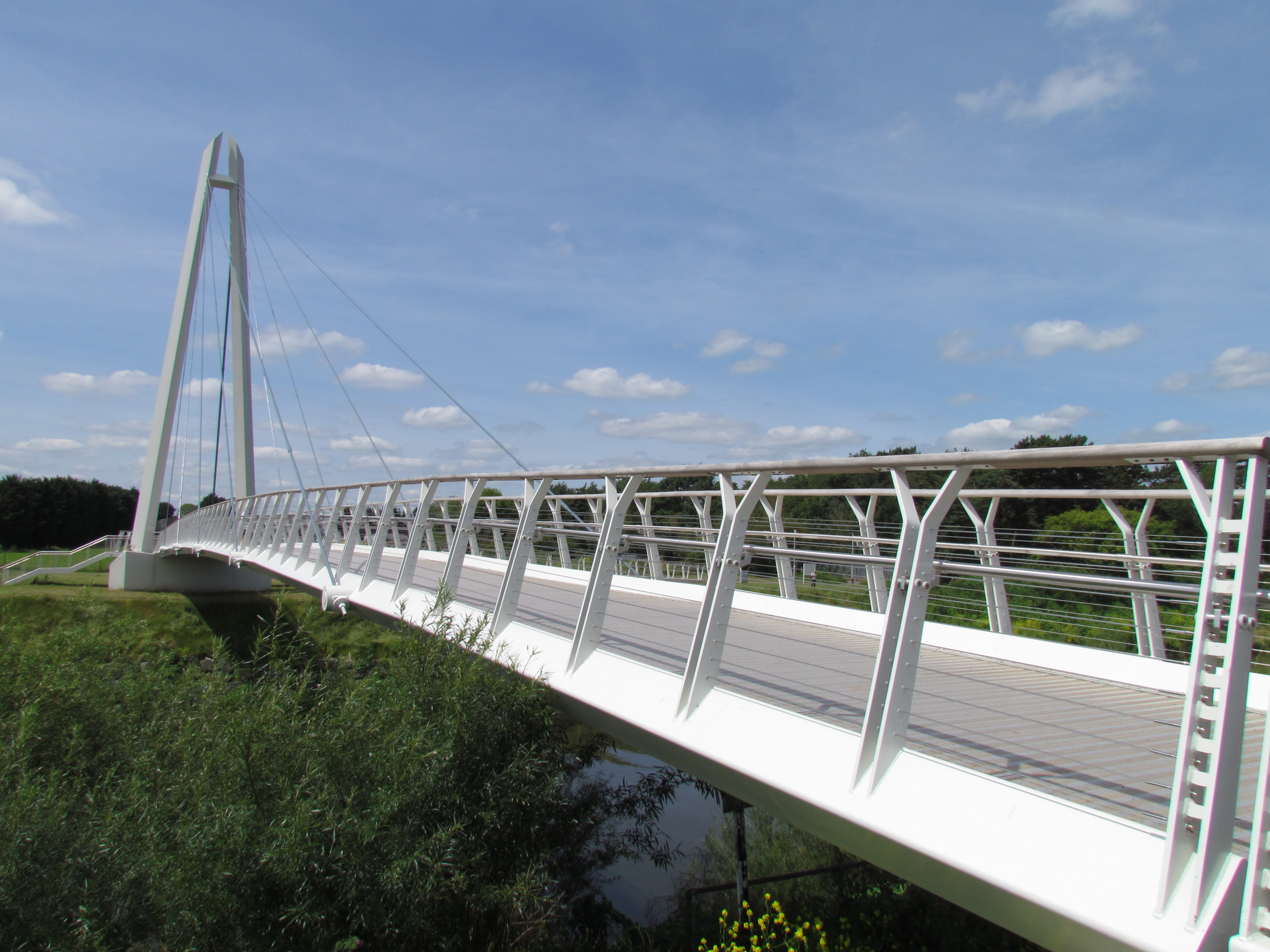
Diglis bicycle and foot bridge over the River Severn

Worcester is on routes 45 and 46 of the National Cycle Network. There are various routes around the city. Diglis Bridge, a pedestrian and Cycle bridge across the Severn, opened in 2010 to St Peter's with Lower Wick. Beryl bikes were introduced in 2024 to hire across Worcester, providing 175 e-bikes and 50 pedal bikes, from a network of 53 bays.

=== Waterways ===
The River Severn is navigable through Worcester, and here it links to the Worcester and Birmingham Canal, which connects Worcester with Birmingham and the rest of the national canal network. Historically used for the transport of goods, the canal network is now used for leisure boating.

== Education ==
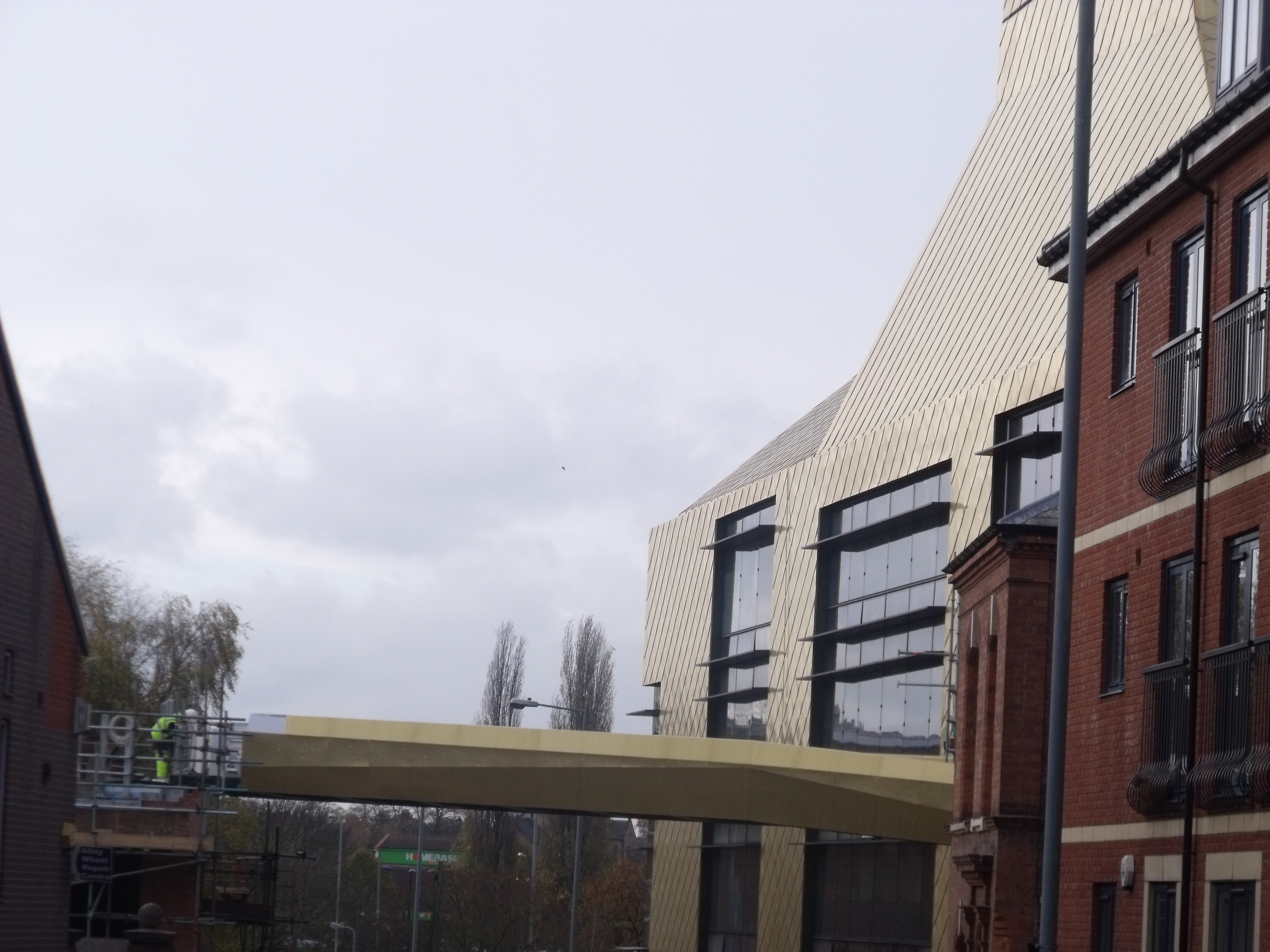
Worcester Library and History Centre

The high schools located in the city are Bishop Perowne CofE College, Blessed Edward Oldcorne Catholic College, Christopher Whitehead Language College, Tudor Grange Academy, Nunnery Wood High School, and the New College Worcester which caters for blind and partially sighted pupils aged 11–18. Independent schools in the city include some of the oldest schools in the country. The Royal Grammar School, first mentioned in 1291, merged with the Alice Ottley School in 2007. The King's School located in the grounds of Worcester Cathedral was re-founded in 1541 under King Henry VIII. Other independent schools include the Independent Christian School, the River School in Fernhill Heath, and New College Worcester.

The University of Worcester was awarded university status in 2005 by the Privy Council, previously known since 1997 as University College Worcester (UCW) and before that as Worcester College of Higher Education. The city is also home to two colleges, Worcester Sixth Form College and Heart of Worcestershire College.

== Hospitals ==
The Worcestershire Royal Hospital is the principal NHS hospital serving the city and county of Worcester. It opened in 2002, replacing the Worcester Royal Infirmary. The former Worcester Eye Hospital was based in the Grade II listed Thornloe House, Barbourne Road, from 1940 to 1995. St Oswald's Hospital on the Tything was founded as alsmhouses and is now a care home.

== Sport ==
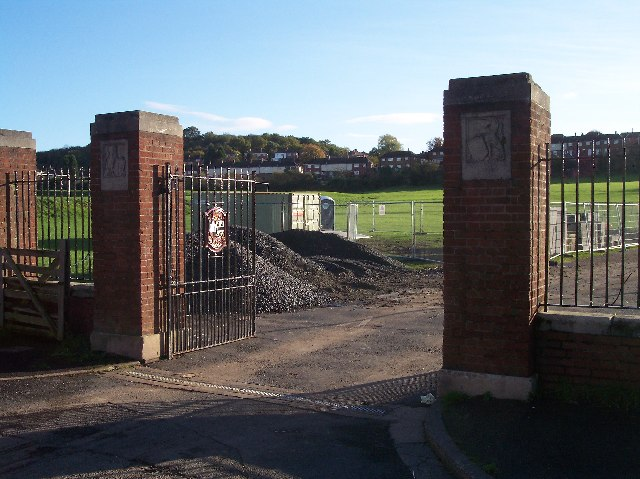
Entrance to the Worcester King George's Field

- Worcestershire County Cricket Club is one of the 18 first-class cricket clubs that contest the County Championship. The club's home is the New Road cricket ground.
- Worcester City Football Club, established in 1902, plays in the Southern Football League Premier Division Central, the seventh tier of English football.
- Worcester Sorcerers Baseball Club, whose home ground is Norton Parish Hall
- Worcester Hockey Club has teams entered in the West Hockey Leagues.
- Worcester St Johns Cycling Club
- Worcester Wolves, a professional basketball team in the British Basketball League, plays at the Worcester Arena.
- Worcester Racecourse is on an open area known as "Pitchcroft" on the east bank of the River Severn.
- Worcester Rugby Football Club is an amateur rugby union club, founded in 1871.
- Worcester Raiders F.C., a professional football club
- Worcester Warriors, a professional rugby union club
- Worcester City Women FC, National League Women's team, who play at Sixways Stadium

== Culture ==
=== Festivals and shows ===
Every three years Worcester becomes home to the Three Choirs Festival, which dates from the 18th century and is credited with being the oldest music festival in the British Isles. The location rotates between the cathedral cities of Gloucester, Hereford and Worcester. Famous for championing English music, especially that of Elgar, Vaughan Williams and Gustav Holst, Worcester hosted the festival in July 2017, but had to postpone its 2020 festival until 2021. The Worcester Festival (established in 2003 by Chris Jaeger MBE) occurs in August and consists of music, theatre, cinema and workshop events, along with a beer festival. For one weekend a year the city plays host to the Worcester Music Festival – a weekend of original music performed predominantly by local bands and musicians. All performances are free and take place around the city centre in bars, clubs, community buildings, churches and the central library.

Founded in 2012, the Worcester Film Festival, places Worcestershire on the film-making map and encourages local people to get involved in making film. The first festival took place at the Hive and included screenings, workshops and talks.

The Victorian-themed Christmas Fayre is a busy event in late November/early December, with over 200 stalls lining the streets, and over 100,000 visitors. The CAMRA Worcester Beer, Cider and Perry Festival takes place for three days each August on Pitchcroft Race Course. It is the largest beer festival in the West Midlands and in the UK top ten with attendances of around 14,000. The Worcester Vegan Market began in 2021 and takes place in late spring and autumn. The Vegan Market fills High Street and Cathedral Square with vegan vendors, vegan food sellers, and vegan food trucks.

=== Arts and cinema ===
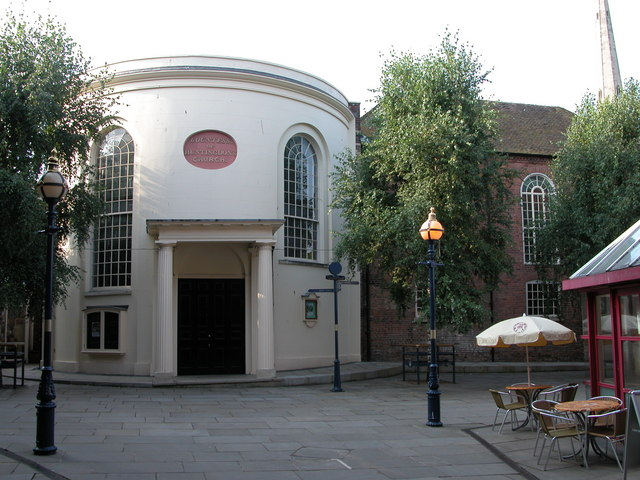
Huntingdon Hall

The 18th-century actress Sarah Siddons made her acting début at the Theatre Royal in Angel Street. Her sister, the novelist Ann Julia Kemble Hatton, otherwise Ann of Swansea, was born in the city. Also born in Worcester was Matilda Alice Powles, better known as Vesta Tilley, a leading male impersonator and music hall artiste. The Swan Theatre stages professional touring and local amateur productions and is the base for the Worcester Repertory Company. Past heads have included John Doyle and David Wood OBE. The director of the company and the theatre as of 2019 is Sarah-Jane Morgan. Stars who started their careers in the Worcester Repertory Company and the Swan Theatre include Imelda Staunton, Sean Pertwee, Celia Imrie, Rufus Norris, Kevin Whately and Bonnie Langford.

Huntingdon Hall is a historic church now used as venue for an eclectic range of musical and comedy performances. Recent acts have included Van Morrison, Eddie Izzard, Jack Dee, Omid Djalili and Jason Manford. The Marrs Bar (in Pierpoint Street) is a venue for gigs and stand-up comedy.

Worcester has two multi-screen cinemas; the Vue Cinema complex is located in Friar Street and the Odeon in Foregate Street – both were 3D-equipped by March 2010.

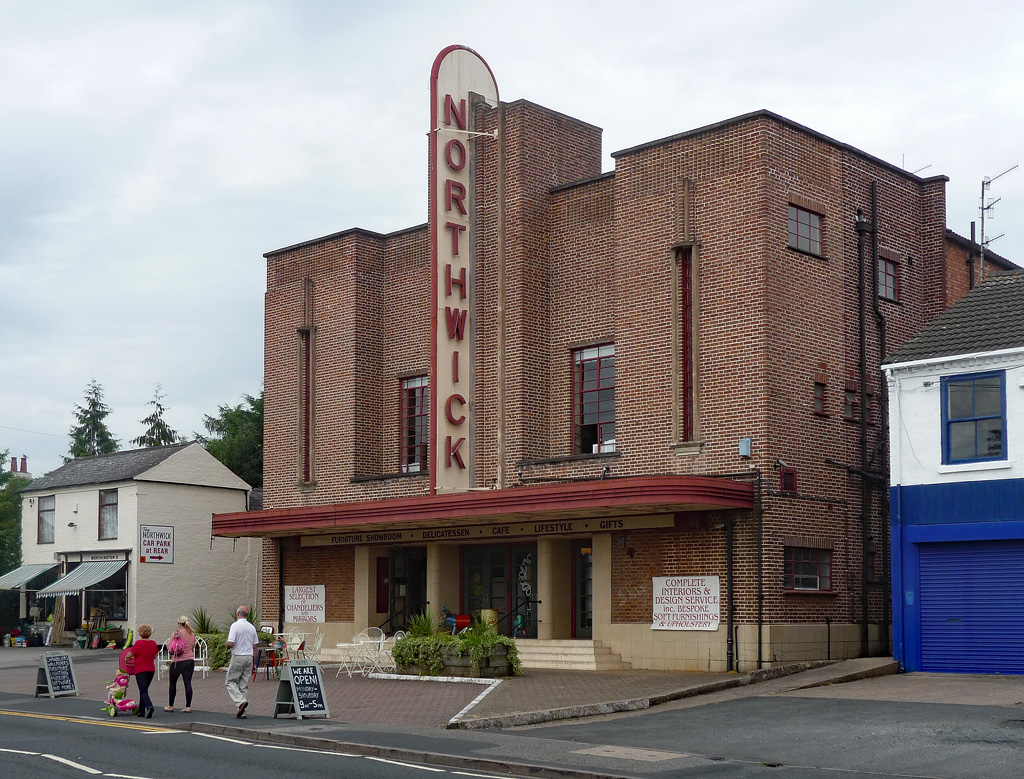
The former Northwick Cinema

After being closed for decades, the Scala building on Angel Place that opened as a cinema in 1922 is due to become a new cultural venue that will create spaces for "live performance, film, workshops, courses and classes" and festivals. The council has signed a contract with a Malvern-based contractor who has announced that work on the Angel Place site will begin in early 2025. Work began in 2025 and the venue is expected to open in late 2026.

The northern suburb of Northwick has the Art Deco Northwick Cinema. Built in 1938, it contains one of only two remaining interiors in Britain designed by John Alexander. The original perspective drawings are held by RIBA. It was a bingo hall from 1966 to 1982, then empty until 1991, a music venue until 1996, and empty again until autumn 2006, when it became an antiques and lifestyle centre, owned by Grey's Interiors, which was previously located in the Tything.

=== Media ===
==== Newspapers ====
- Berrow's Worcester Journal
- Worcester News
- Worcester Observer

==== Radio stations ====
- BBC Hereford & Worcester
- Hits Radio
- Radio Wyvern
- Heart West Midlands
- Sunshine Radio
- Capital Mid-Counties
- Smooth West Midlands
- Greatest Hits Radio

==== Television ====
Local news and television programmes are provided by BBC West Midlands and ITV Central from the Ridge Hill TV transmitter.

== In popular culture ==
=== Mildred Arkell ===
The depression that hit the Worcester glove industry in the 1820s and 1830s is the background to a three-volume novel, Mildred Arkell, by the Victorian novelist Ellen Wood (then Mrs Henry Wood).

=== Cadfael Chronicles ===
The well-researched historical novel The Virgin in the Ice, part of Ellis Peters' The Cadfael Chronicles series, depicts Worcester at the time of the Anarchy. It begins with the words:

"It was early in November of 1139 that the tide of civil war, lately so sluggish and inactive, rose suddenly to wash over the city of Worcester, wash away half of its livestock, property and women and send all those of its inhabitants who could get away in time scurrying for their lives northwards away from the marauders." (These are mentioned as arriving from Gloucester, leaving a long-lasting legacy of bitterness between the two cities.)

== Twinning ==
Worcester is twinned with:

- Kleve, Germany (the home of Anne of Cleves, the fourth wife of Henry VIII)
- Le Vésinet, France
- Worcester, Massachusetts, US
- Ukmergė, Lithuania

== Notable people ==
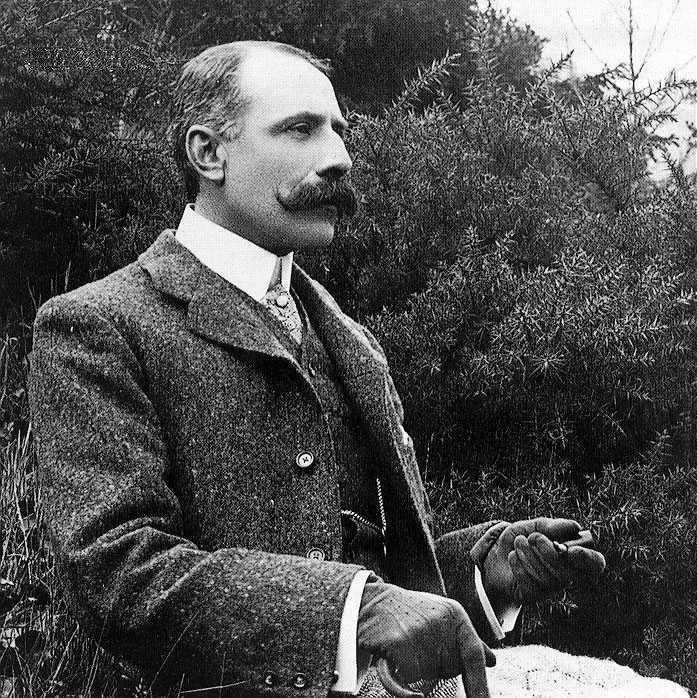
Edward Elgar

In birth order:

- Hannah Snell (1723–1792), famous for impersonating a man and enlisting in the Royal Marines, born and brought up in Worcester
- Elizabeth Blower (c. 1757/63 – post-1816), novelist, poet and actress, born and raised in Worcester
- Ann Hatton (1764–1838), writer of the Kemble family, born in Worcester
- James White (1775–1820), founder of first advertising agency in 1800 in London, born in Worcester
- John Mathew Gutch (1776–1861), journalist; lived with his second wife at Barbourne, a suburb north of Worcester, from 1823 until his death
- Jabez Allies (1787–1856), Worcestershire folklorist and antiquarian lived at Lower Wick, now part of Worcester
- Sir Charles Hastings (1794–1866), British Medical Association founder, attended Worcester Royal Grammar School and lived in Worcester for most of his life, spending his final years in Malvern
- Revd Thomas Davis (1804–1887), hymn-writer, born in Worcester
- Philip Henry Gosse (1810–1888), naturalist, born in Worcester
- Mrs. Henry Wood (1814–1887), writer, born in Worcester
- Alexander Clunes Sheriff (1816–1878), city alderman, businessman and Liberal MP, grew up in Worcester
- Edward Leader Williams (1828–1910), designer of the Manchester Ship Canal, born and brought up at Diglis House in Worcester
- Benjamin Williams Leader (1831–1923), brother of Edward Leader Williams, landscape artist
- Sir Thomas Brock (1847–1922), sculptor, best known for the London Victoria Memorial, born in Worcester in 1847; Worcestershire Royal Hospital is in a road named after him
- Vesta Tilley (1864–1952), music hall performer who adopted this stage name aged 11, born in Worcester; became a noted male impersonator
- Sir Edward Elgar (1857–1934), composer, born in Lower Broadheath, just outside Worcester, and lived in the city from the age of two
- William Morris, 1st Viscount Nuffield (1877–1963), founder of Morris Motors and philanthropist, spent the first three years in Worcester
- Geoffrey Studdert Kennedy (1883–1929, "Woodbine Willy"), poet and author, vicar of St Paul's Church
- Louise Johnson (1940–2012), biochemist and protein crystallographer, born in Worcester
- Timothy Garden, Baron Garden (1944–2007), air marshal and Liberal Democrat politician, born and educated in Worcester
- Dave Mason (1946–2026), musician and guitarist, founding member of the rock band Traffic, born in Worcester
- Martin Gale (born 1949), painter, based in Ireland
- David McGreavy (born 1951, the "Monster of Worcester"), lived and committed child murders in Worcester
- Stephen Dorrell (born 1952), English Conservative politician and former government minister, born in Worcester
- Karl Hyde (born 1957), English musician, frontman of trance music group Underworld born in Worcester
- Vincenzo Nicoli (born 1958), British actor
- Isabelle Jane Foulkes (1970–2001), Anglo-Welsh artist, textile designer and disability campaigner
- Ben Humphrey (born 1986), British actor, director and writer, associate director of the Worcester Repertory Company
- Kit Harington (born 1986), actor, lived in Worcester and attended the Chantry School and Worcester Sixth Form College; plays Jon Snow in Game of Thrones
- Kai Alexander (born 1997), British actor, born in Worcester

=== Sport ===
- Ernest Payne (1884–1961), born in Worcester, rode for St Johns Cycling Club, winning a gold medal in team pursuit at the 1908 Summer Olympics in London

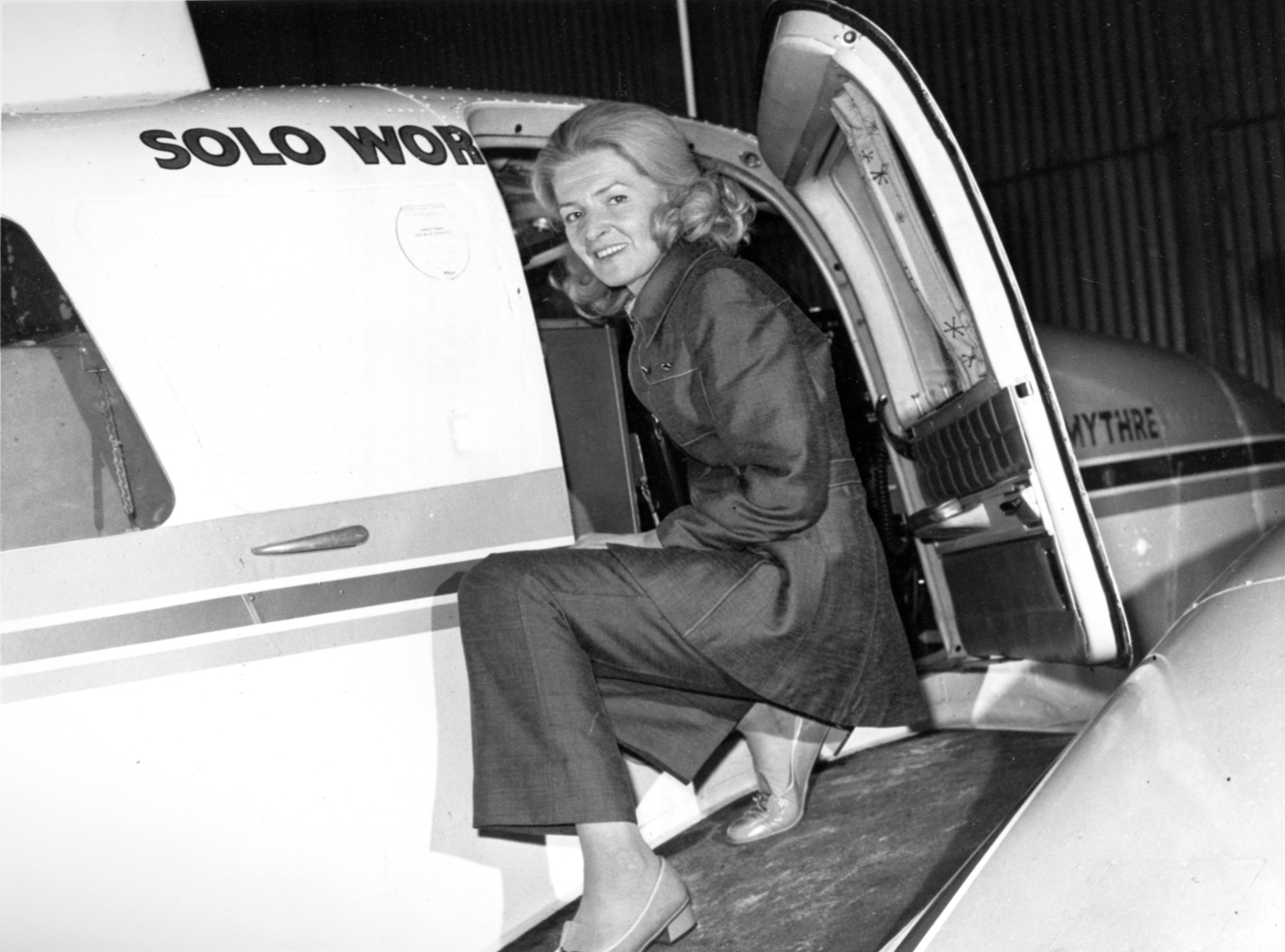
Sheila Scott

- Sheila Scott (1922–1988), aviator, born in Worcester
- Imran Khan (born 1952), cricketer and prime minister of Pakistan, attended the Royal Grammar School Worcester and played cricket for Worcestershire County Cricket Club (1971–1976)
- Donncha O'Callaghan (born 1979), Irish rugby union player; joined Worcester Warriors in 2015 from Munster Rugby Irish and British and Irish Lions International
- Matt Richards (born 2002), British swimmer, born and raised in Worcester; double Olympic champion
- Laura Blindkilde Brown (born 2003), footballer for the England national team

== See also ==
- Jewish community of Worcester
- Bishop of Worcester
- List of mayors of Worcester
- Listed buildings in Worcester (centre)
- Listed buildings in Worcester (outside the centre)

== Sources ==
- MacDonald, Alec (1969) [1943], Worcestershire in English History (Reprint ed.), London: SR Publishers, ISBN 978-0854095759
- Willis-Bund, J W; Page, William, eds. (1971a). "Hospitals: Worcester". A History of the County of Worcester: Volume 2. London: British History Online. pp. 175–179.
- Willis-Bund, J W; Page, William, eds. (1971b). "Friaries: Worcester". A History of the County of Worcester: Volume 2. London: British History Online. pp. 167–173.
- Reekes, Andrew (15 November 2019), Worcester Moments, Alcester, Worcestershire: West Midlands History Limited, ISBN 9781905036769, OL 31795289M
- Willis-Bund, J W; Page, William, eds. (1924). "The city of Worcester: Introduction and borough". A History of the County of Worcester: Volume 4. London: British History Online. pp. 376–390.
- Pevsner, Nikolaus; Brookes, Alan (2007), "Worcester", Worcestershire, The Buildings of England (Revised ed.), London: Yale University Press, pp. 669–778, ISBN 9780300112986, OL 10319229M
- Tuberville, T. C. (1852), Worcestershire in the nineteenth century., London: Longman, Brown, Green, and Longmans, LCCN 03006251, OCLC 9095242, OL 7063181M
- Baker, Nigel; Holt, Richard (1996). "The City of Worcester in the Tenth Century". In Brooks, Nicholas; Cubitt, Catherine (eds.). St. Oswald of Worcester: Life and Influence. London, UK: Leicester University Press. ISBN 9780567340313.
- de Blois, Peter (1194). "Against the Perfidy of the Jews". Medieval Sourcebook. University of Fordham. "A treatise addressed to John Bishop of Worcester, probably John of Coutances who held that See, 1194-8."
- Hillaby, Joe (1990). "The Worcester Jewry 1158-1290". Transactions of the Worcester Archaeological Society. 12: 73–122.
- Mason, Emma (2004). "Beauchamp, Walter de (1192/3–1236), justice". Oxford Dictionary of National Biography (online ed.). Oxford University Press. doi:10.1093/ref:odnb/1842. (Subscription, Wikipedia Library access or UK public library membership required.)
- Lazare, Bernard (1903), Antisemitism, its history and causes., New York: The International library publishing co., LCCN 03015369, OCLC 3055229, OL 7137045M
- Mundill, Robin R (2002). England's Jewish Solution: Experiment and Expulsion, 1262–1290. Cambridge University Press. ISBN 978-0-521-52026-3.
- Vincent, Nicholas (1994). "Two Papal Letters on the Wearing of the Jewish Badge, 1221 and 1229". Jewish Historical Studies. 34: 209–24. JSTOR 29779960.
- Atkin, Malcolm (1998). Cromwell's Crowning Mercy: The Battle of Worcester 1651. Barnsley: Pen and Sword. ISBN 0-7509-1888-8. OL 478350M.
- Atkin, Malcolm (2004). Worcestershire under arms. Barnsley: Pen and Sword. ISBN 1-84415-072-0. OL 11908594M.
- Watts, Victor Ernest, ed. (2004). The Cambridge Dictionary of English Place-Names. Cambridge University Press. ISBN 9781107196896.
- Pryce, Mike (21 July 2023). "Plans for blue plaque in Worcester to remember Jewish community". Worcester News.
- "Kays Heritage Group". Kays Heritage Group. 19 May 2012. Archived from the original on 6 January 2013.
- Historic England. "Former Corn Exchange and attached railings (1359548)". National Heritage List for England.
- Barrow, Julia (2013). "Worcester". In Lapidge, Michael; Blair, John; Keynes, Simon; Scragg, Donald (eds.). The Wiley Blackwell Encyclopedia of Anglo-Saxon England. Wiley-Blackwell. ISBN 978-0470656327.
- Clifton-Taylor, Alec (1967). The Cathedrals of England (2nd ed.). Thames and Hudson Ltd. ISBN 978-0500200629.

=== Further reading ===
- John Britton; et al. (1814), "City of Worcester", Worcestershire, Beauties of England and Wales, vol. 15, London: J. Harris, hdl:2027/mdp.39015063565835
- "Worcester", Black's Picturesque Tourist and Road-book of England and Wales (3rd ed.), Edinburgh: Adam and Charles Black, 1853
- "Worcester", Great Britain (4th ed.), Leipsic: Karl Baedeker, 1897, OCLC 6430424
