= St Peter the Great County, Worcestershire =

Parish and suburb of Worcester in Worcestershire, England

Coordinates: 52.172384°N 2.204530°W

St Peter the Great County
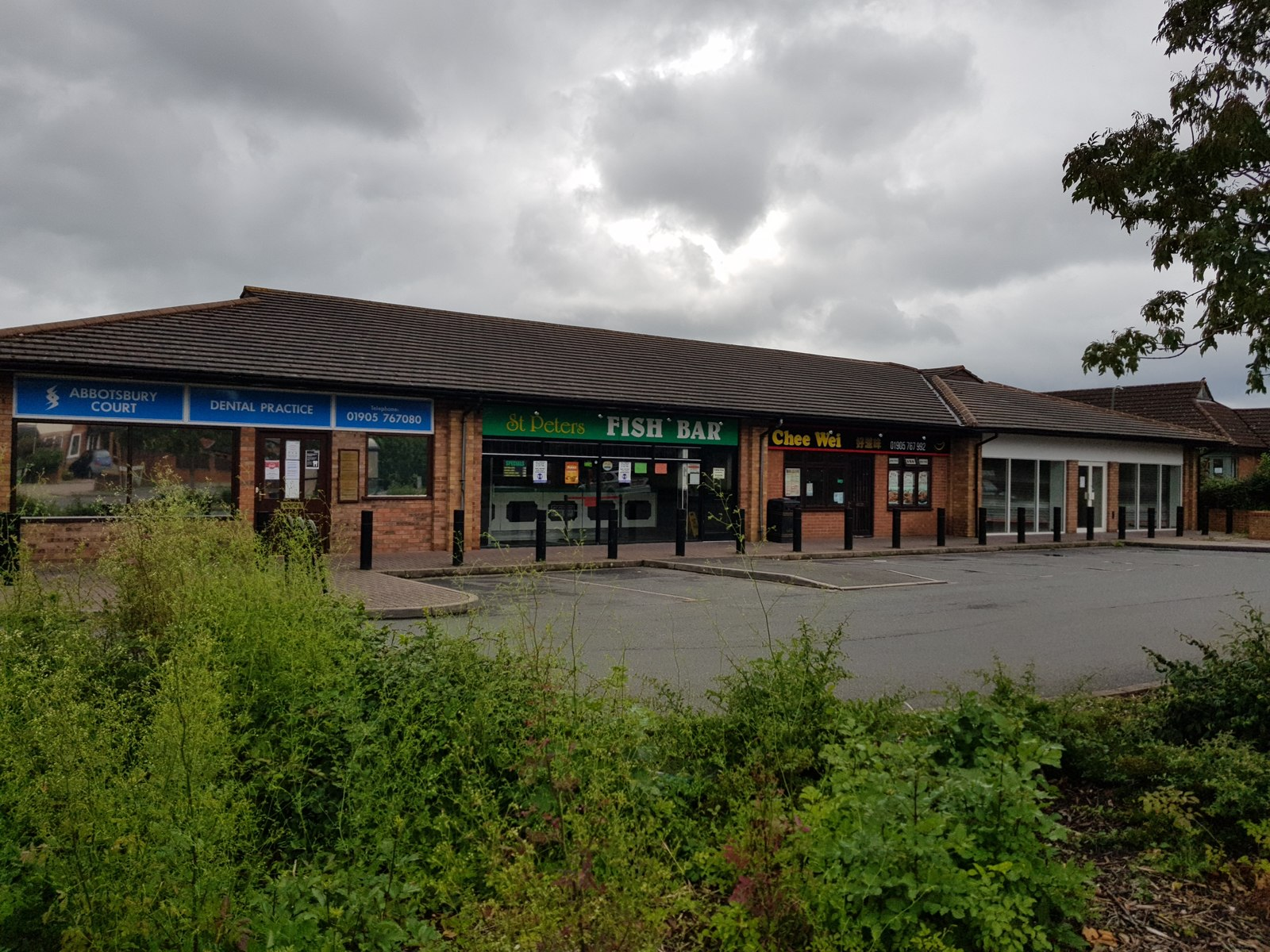
- Abbotsbury Court, St Peter the Great County, Worcester

- Location within Worcestershire
- Population: 5,650 2021 Census
  - London: 134 mi (216 km) SE
- Civil parish: St Peter the Great
- District: Worcester
- Shire county: Worcestershire
- Region: West Midlands
- Country: England
- Sovereign state: United Kingdom
- Post town: Worcester
- Postcode district: WR5
- Dialling code: 01905
- Police: West Mercia
- Fire: Hereford and Worcester
- Ambulance: West Midlands
- UK Parliament: Worcester

St Peter the Great County, also known as St Peter the Great or St Peter, is a southern suburb of Worcester in Worcestershire, England. It is also a civil parish and is known as St. Peters. It lies on the east side of the River Severn and near Junction 7 of the M5 motorway. In the 2021 census, the parish population was recorded as 5,650.

== Church and parish ==
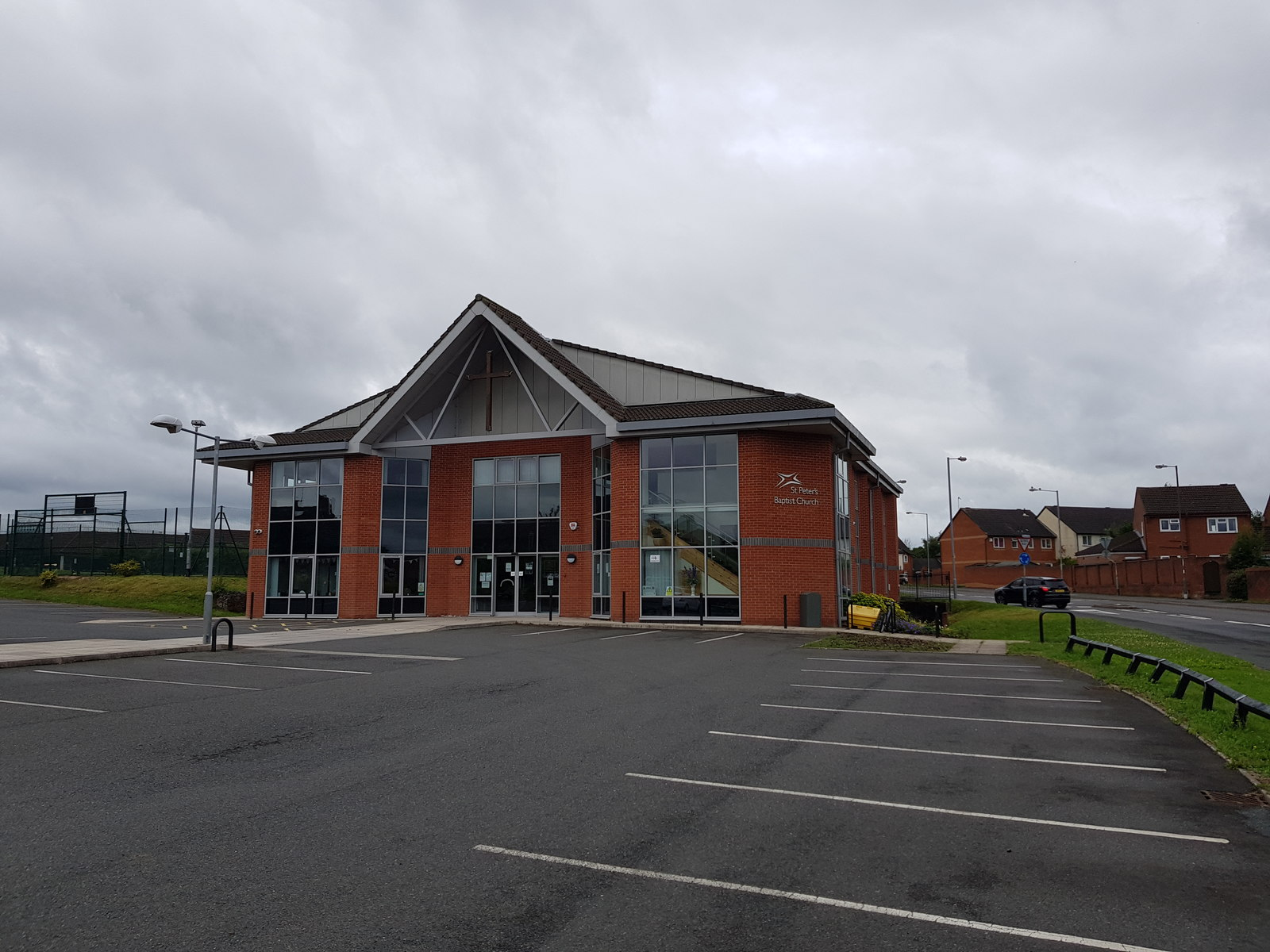
St Peter's Baptist Church

The parish is named after the Church of St Peter the Great (so named to distinguish it from the chapel of Worcester Castle, "St Peter the Less"), which stood between King Street and Sidbury in Worcester, by the Royal Worcester porcelain factory (now the Museum of Royal Worcester). The medieval church was rebuilt in brick in the style of a Commissioners' church in 1836/37. This building became structurally unsafe, was closed in 1972, declared redundant in 1974, and demolished in 1976. The church site is now housing and a car park (2016).

The church parish was joined with that of St Martin's Church, London Road, the combined parish of St Martin with St Peter being established on 1 August 1974. The congregation and the World War I memorial were transferred there.

The ancient parish included parts within and outside the city of Worcester. In 1894 the parish was divided for civil purposes: the part within the county borough of Worcester became the civil parish of St Peter the Great City (merged into the civil parish of Worcester in 1898), and the part outside the city became the civil parish of St Peter the Great County, the basis of the modern parish of St Peter the Great.

St Peter's Parish Council was created in 1994.

== Suburb ==
The Ordnance Survey map of 1977 shows St Peter the Great County as farmland, with a main road and a single country road with a few cottages. The housing estate was developed in the 1980s and 1990s.

St Peter the Great, or "St Peters" as it is commonly known, is mainly a large housing estate. There is a part-time doctors' surgery, a village hall, a Tesco superstore, a petrol station and a small shopping area containing an Ale Hub micropub. In 2007, a Baptist church opened close to the centre of the estate; the church centre is used for worship, meetings and youth activities, and meetings of other groups.
