= Lower Wick, Worcester =

Suburb of Worcester in Worcestershire, England

Coordinates: 52.174418°N 2.232898°W

Lower Wick
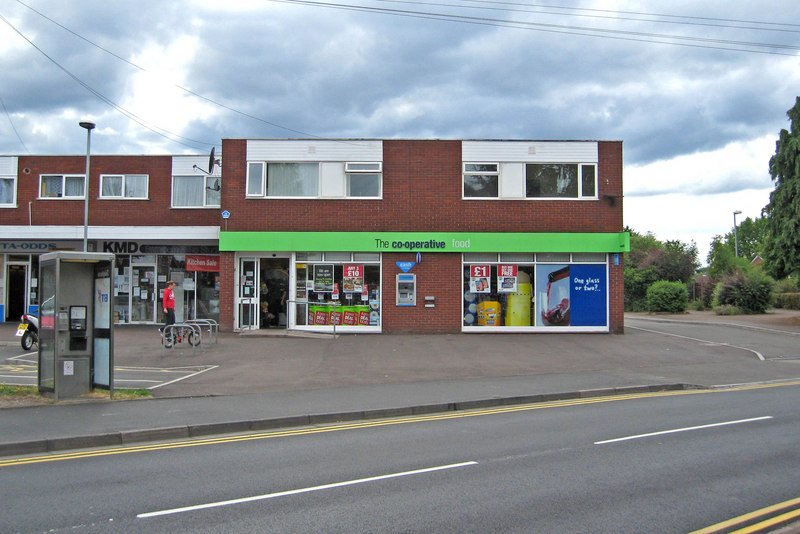
- Canada Drive, Lower Wick, Worcester

- Location within Worcestershire
  - London: 137 mi (220 km) SE
- District: Worcester
- Shire county: Worcestershire
- Region: West Midlands
- Country: England
- Sovereign state: United Kingdom
- Post town: Worcester
- Postcode district: WR2
- Dialling code: 01905
- Police: West Mercia
- Fire: Hereford and Worcester
- Ambulance: West Midlands
- UK Parliament: Worcester

Lower Wick is a southwestern suburb of Worcester in Worcestershire, England. It is located to the south of St. John's and to the west of the River Severn, adjacent to Powick. It is primarily composed of a 1960s housing estate made up of roads with a Canadian theme to their names, but there is a newer 1990s housing development where the roads are named after bird species.

Lower Wick Manor House is on a site that dates back to the 13th century and was formerly the house of the Bishop of Worcester. The Manor Farm now operates as Bennetts Farm, a tourist attraction in Lower Wick next to the River Severn where ice cream is produced. Much of the Battle of Worcester, the final battle of the English Civil War in 1651, took place where the farm is today. The tree in which King Charles II is famously thought to have hidden stood in between Lower Wick and Powick by the River Teme. Southwick Lodge on the Old Road to Powick is a Grade II listed 1830s villa.

Lower Wick's location less than 1 mile north-west of the confluence between the Severn and the Teme means it is often affected by flooding. During the July 2007 floods, all main roads in and out of Lower Wick and St John's were closed due to floodwater.

Lower Wick has a golf course and a swimming pool. One of two Churches of Latter Day Saints in Worcestershire is located in Lower Wick. There is also a non-denominational church, a petrol station, and several other shops.

== Notable people ==
Jabez Allies, (1787–1856) a solicitor and an important writer on Worcestershire history and folklore lived in Lower Wick.
