= Grade II* listed buildings in Worcester =

Worcestershire shown within England

There are over 20,000 Grade II* listed buildings in England. This page is a list of these buildings in the district of Worcester in Worcestershire.

== Worcester ==
Name	Location	Type	Completed (Note: The date given is the date used by Historic England as significant for the initial building or that of an important part in the structure's description.)	Date designated	Grid ref. (Note: Sometimes known as OSGB36, the grid reference is based on the British national grid reference system used by the Ordnance Survey.) Geo-coordinates	Entry number (Note: The "List Entry Number" is a unique number assigned to each listed building and scheduled monument by Historic England.)	Image
Warndon Court	Warndon, Worcester	Farmhouse	Early 17th century	14 March 1969	SO8874056864; 52°12′36″N 2°09′58″W	1166562	Warndon Court More images
Boundary Walls to East Side of River Severn extending North from the Water Gate	Worcester	Boundary Wall	Possible 14th-century origins	5 April 1971	SO8487854617; 52°11′23″N 2°13′21″W	1389929	Boundary Walls to East Side of River Severn extending North from the Water Gate
Boundary Walls to East Side of River Severn extending South from the Water Gate	Worcester	Boundary Wall	Possible 14th-century origins	27 June 2001	SO8491054360; 52°11′14″N 2°13′20″W	1389930	Boundary Walls to East Side of River Severn extending South from the Water Gate
Britannia House (Alice Ottley School)	Worcester	House	1730-1750	22 May 1954	SO8480855701; 52°11′58″N 2°13′25″W	1390240	Britannia House (Alice Ottley School) More images
Bushwackers	Worcester	House/Pub	c. 1750	22 May 1954	SO8503555034; 52°11′36″N 2°13′13″W	1390182	Bushwackers More images
Church of All Saints	Worcester	Parish Church	Norman	22 May 1954	SO8478554875; 52°11′31″N 2°13′26″W	1063890	Church of All Saints More images
Church of St George (Roman Catholic)	Worcester	Church	1829	22 May 1954	SO8509155182; 52°11′41″N 2°13′10″W	1390134	Church of St George (Roman Catholic) More images
Church of St Helen	Worcester	Record Office	From 1957-2002	22 May 1954	SO8501054708; 52°11′25″N 2°13′15″W	1389795	Church of St Helen More images
Church of St John	Worcester	Church	1481 Tower added	22 May 1954	SO8401654466; 52°11′18″N 2°14′07″W	1390120	Church of St John More images
Church of St John the Baptist	Claines, Worcester	Parish Church	12th century	14 March 1969	SO8514358862; 52°13′40″N 2°13′08″W	1063810	Church of St John the Baptist More images
Church of St Martin	Worcester	Parish Church	1768-1772	22 May 1954	SO8513455002; 52°11′35″N 2°13′08″W	1389755	Church of St Martin More images
City Museum and Library with Gates	Worcester	Museum	1896	5 April 1971	SO8490755372; 52°11′47″N 2°13′20″W	1389828	City Museum and Library with Gates More images
Former Church of St Nicholas	Worcester	Restaurant	2001	22 May 1954	SO8499455059; 52°11′37″N 2°13′15″W	1390194	Former Church of St Nicholas More images
Huntingdon Hall	Crowngate, Worcester	Chapel/Concert Hall		22 May 1954	SO8491354856; 52°11′30″N 2°13′20″W	1063893	Huntingdon Hall More images
Judges Lodgings and attached Railings	Worcester	Office	2001	5 April 1971	SO8495555428; 52°11′49″N 2°13′18″W	1390144	Upload Photo
King Charles House	Worcester	Apartment	2001	22 May 1954	SO8518554943; 52°11′33″N 2°13′05″W	1389751	King Charles House More images
King Charles House	Worcester	House	Restored 1986	22 May 1954	SO8518854931; 52°11′33″N 2°13′05″W	1390020	King Charles House More images
Monastic Ruins	Worcester	Benedictine Monastery	c. 1320	22 May 1954	SO8491354487; 52°11′18″N 2°13′20″W	1359629	Monastic Ruins More images
Nash House (no 7 and 7a, New Street)	Worcester	House	c. 1674	22 May 1954	SO8515554800; 52°11′28″N 2°13′07″W	1390010	Nash House (no 7 and 7a, New Street) More images
No 15, College Green and Wall adjoining to East	Worcester	House	c1720-30	22 May 1954	SO8506454459; 52°11′17″N 2°13′12″W	1063827	No 15, College Green and Wall adjoining to East More images
No 9, College Green and attached Wall to left at rear	Worcester	House	C18-early 19th century extension	22 May 1954	SO8495254353; 52°11′14″N 2°13′18″W	1063821	No 9, College Green and attached Wall to left at rear More images
Old Assembly Room	Worcester	Assembly Rooms	1749	22 May 1954	SO8489955155; 52°11′40″N 2°13′20″W	1390155	Old Assembly Room
Powick Mills	Lower Wick, Worcester	House	1999	7 March 1989	SO8350752542; 52°10′15″N 2°14′33″W	1390029	Powick Mills More images
Premises occupied by Bradford and Bingley Building Society	2, The Cross, Worcester	House	Early 18th century	22 May 1954	SO8500355007; 52°11′35″N 2°13′15″W	1390187	Premises occupied by Bradford and Bingley Building Society More images
Queen Elizabeth House	Worcester	Timber Framed House	Early and Mid 18th century	22 May 1954	SO8507355019; 52°11′36″N 2°13′11″W	1390238	Queen Elizabeth House More images
Rose Place	Claines, Worcester	House	Early 19th century	21 March 1985	SO8593758404; 52°13′25″N 2°12′26″W	1389926	Rose Place More images
Royal Worcester Porcelain Works: Pan Grinding Shop and attached Buildings	Worcester	Boiler House	1862-1870	15 March 1990	SO8517154280; 52°11′12″N 2°13′06″W	1390149	Royal Worcester Porcelain Works: Pan Grinding Shop and attached Buildings
Shire Hall	Worcester	Shire Hall	c1834-35	22 May 1954	SO8492255420; 52°11′48″N 2°13′19″W	1389831	Shire Hall More images
Shrub Hill Station: Waiting Room to East Platform	Worcester	Waiting Room	c. 1880	5 April 1971	SO8583055128; 52°11′39″N 2°12′31″W	1390157	Shrub Hill Station: Waiting Room to East Platform More images
South African War Memorial	Worcester	War Memorial	1908	19 August 1999	SO8502554577; 52°11′21″N 2°13′14″W	1389731	South African War Memorial More images
St Andrew's Church Tower	Worcester	Church	15th century	22 May 1954	SO8486454783; 52°11′28″N 2°13′22″W	1389762	St Andrew's Church Tower More images
The Deanery (no 10, College Green) and Office (10A) with attached Walls	Worcester	House	Possible earlier origins	22 May 1954	SO8493754374; 52°11′15″N 2°13′18″W	1063822	Upload Photo
The Pheasant	Worcester	Jettied House	Late 16th century	22 May 1954	SO8517954896; 52°11′32″N 2°13′06″W	1390016	The Pheasant More images
Tudor House Museum	Worcester	Timber Framed House	c1575-1625	22 May 1954	SO8513154648; 52°11′24″N 2°13′08″W	1389852	Tudor House Museum More images
Water Gate House and attached Walls and Gate to East	Worcester	House	17th century	22 May 1954	SO8490754425; 52°11′16″N 2°13′20″W	1063824	Water Gate House and attached Walls and Gate to East More images
Whiteladies House at Worcester Grammar School	Worcester	House	c. 1720	22 May 1954	SO8479455808; 52°12′01″N 2°13′26″W	1390245	Upload Photo
61 Broad Street	Worcester	House	Circa 1740s	22 May 1954	SO8491654954; 52°11′33″N 2°13′19″W	1063886	61 Broad Street More images
3 Edgar Street	Worcester	House	1732	22 May 1954	SO8511854438; 52°11′17″N 2°13′09″W	1389776	3 Edgar Street
14, 16 and 18 Friar Street	14, 16 and 18 Friar Street, Worcester	House	Later alterations	22 May 1954	SO8512054710; 52°11′26″N 2°13′09″W	1389840	14, 16 and 18 Friar Street More images
26–32 Friar Street	Worcester	House	Later alterations	22 May 1954	SO8512554681; 52°11′25″N 2°13′08″W	1389846	26–32 Friar Street More images
