= Anita Lafford =

British sculptor

- Born: Cheltenham, Gloucestershire
- Education: Cheltenham College of Art,. Royal Academy of Arts
- Known for: Human and animal sculptures
- Notable work: 'Welcome Home' Fleetwood, 'Anticipation' Uxbridge, Garden of Heroes & Villains
- Spouse: Francis Bellingham

Anita Lafford is an English sculptor who creates animal and human works including group pieces in bronze.

== Early life ==
Born in Cheltenham, Gloucestershire, Lafford was educated in Cheltenham and The Royal Academy of Arts. She later opened a studio in Llandogo, South Wales.

== Commissions ==
=== Statue of King John, Worcester ===
Her first major commission was a ciment fondu with a Portland stone backing of King John, wearing his crown and mounted on his horse. The work is to be found on Copenhagen Street, Worcester and was introduced in 1966. The King is buried 200 yards away in Worcester Cathedral.

King John - Copenhagen Street, Worcester

Lafford with her head of the former Prince Charles (photo with the kind permission of The Royal Collection Trust and photographer Brian Donnan)

=== Head of Prince Charles ===
In 1974 Lafford was short-listed to sculpt a bronze head of the former Prince Charles. Her name was put forward by Sir Knox Cunningham QC for whom she had made a sculpture of his wife, Lady Dorothy Cunningham. From the shortlist, Prince Charles expressed a preference for Lafford to perform the work which was to be made for The Drapers Company - Prince Charles was admitted to the Freedom of The Drapers' Company in 1971. Lafford completed the sculpture over two sittings, working straight into the clay because she knew his time would be very limited. She made two heads, one is displayed in the Drapers Hall drawing room and the other was presented to HM Queen Elizabeth II at Queen Elizabeth College Greenwich

=== Head of Sir Terry Waite ===
In 1991 Lafford constructed a bronze study of Sir Terry Waite. He sat for her soon after his release from captivity in Lebanon. The work was later cast in bronze, and is now on display at Trinity Hall, Cambridge.

=== Welcome Home, bronze group at Fleetwood ===
In 1997, Lafford was sponsored by Doreen Lofthouse MBE, founder of Lofthouse of Fleetwood and Fisherman's Friend brand, with assistance from the Wyre Borough Council, to sculpt a lifesize bronze group of three figures depicting a woman in a summer dress nursing a baby, with her daughter and their faithful dog (a Lancashire heeler) welcoming home the fishing fleet. Displayed on The Esplanade at Fleetwood, overlooking the River Wyre.That spot is where for generations families used to wait to greet trawlermen returning from fishing grounds. The work has become a tribute to the bereaved families of Fleetwood fishermen. The statue recalls the heyday of Fleetwood's trawling trade.

'Welcome Home' Esplanade, Fleetwood

=== Anticipation, bronze group in Uxbridge ===
This group was commissioned by Hillingdon Arts Association to commemorate the Golden Jubilee of Elizabeth II. The group depicts a mother and baby with her child and the family dog waiting to greet a loved one and is displayed in Uxbridge High Street by The Chimes. It was unveiled by the Queen on 25 June 2002. The work was vandalised and damaged in 2003, but later restored after eight months.

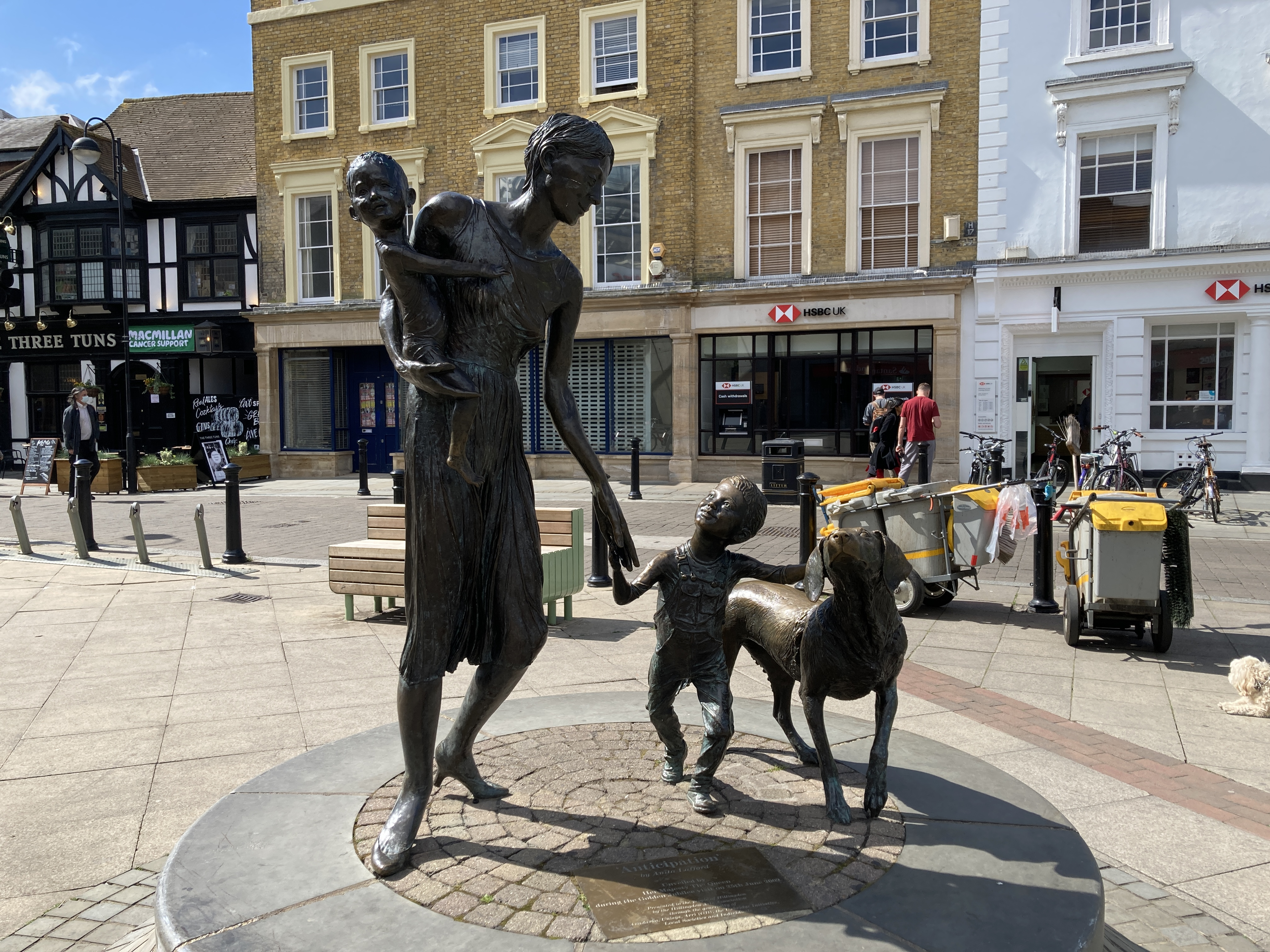
'Anticipation' High Street Uxbridge

=== Infantry man, bronze statue in Brecon ===
In 2013 she sculpted an infantry soldier in combat which is displayed at the Infantry Battle School at Brecon, Wales and unveiled by Princess Anne. It was described by Brigadier Iain Cholerton (Commander of 160 [Wales] Brigade) as "a fitting tribute to the courage and fighting qualities of the British infantryman."

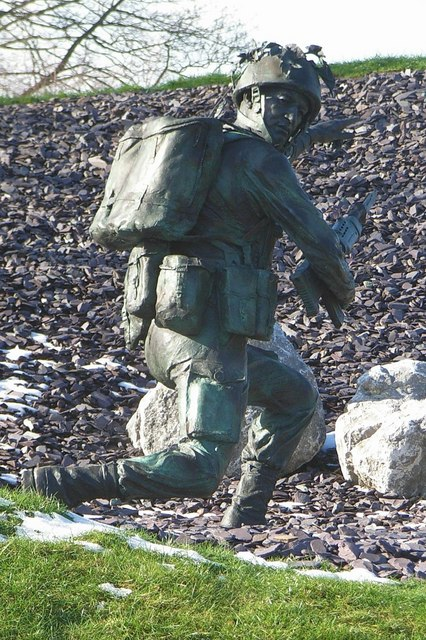
Infantry Man - Brecon

=== The Garden of Heroes and Villains - Dorsington, South Warwickshire ===
The Garden of Heroes and Villains is situated in Dorsington Nr. Stratford on Avon amongst landscaped gardens created in 1989 by Felix Dennis, founder of Heart of England Forest. Over the years he collected over fifty life-sized statues of famous figures in history to be displayed in the gardens. Five of these were created by Lafford:

- Oscar Wilde (1997): A bronze statue of the elegantly dressed author and playwright at the age of 26 or 27, is to be seen holding a lily. (See picture below)
- Lawrence of Arabia (2005): This bronze statue of Lawrence of Arabia seated on his favourite camel, Jeddah, is fourteen feet high. He is flying to recover a lost man Gasim, and depicted at full gallop with his headdress trailing behind. (See picture below)
- Leonardo da Vinci (2010): The life-sized statue of the iconic renaissance painter is situated close to one of his well known creations: Vitruvian Man. (See picture below)
- Vitruvian Man (2009): This life-sized representation of Da Vinci's iconic work is in bronze.
- Galileo Galilei (2001): The subject is depicted holding a model of the moon which he is measuring with his fingers as he became blind whilst studying sunspots through his telescope. Galileo is standing beside his telescope. (See picture below)

The photos of the garden sculptures are displayed with the kind permission of Heart of England Forest.

=== Cheltenham Masonic Hall ===
In 1981 Lafford was commissioned to restore the Banqueting Hall at the Cheltenham Masonic Hall in Portland Street. The Banqueting Hall’s magnificent decorative work had deteriorated badly, suffering from smoke-damage, damp and general wear over the years. Using her artistic skills, Lafford cleaned, repaired and, where necessary, recreated the historic murals. In 1982 she was invited back to guide the restoration of the Lodge Room's return to its former glory, this involved restoring the distinctive Globes, Anthemion and portrait of St. John.

=== All Saints' Church, Pittville, Cheltenham ===
In 1991 Lafford was commissioned to undertake artistic restoration work at All Saints’ Church, Pittville, Cheltenham, a Grade 1 listed building. A large mural on the west wall of the nave painted in sub-Morris style by Sir William Richmond RA had suffered badly from water damage and in consequence, had been obliterated by a covering of acoustic tiles. The tiles were removed and Lafford largely recreated the mural using a single black & white photograph and also using pictures of the pre Raphaelite muses.

=== Other commissioned works ===
- Bronze horse 'Gold Cup winner' exhibited in Annecy France presented by the Cheltenham Industrial Delegation to its twin town, Annecy.
- Portrait bust of H.M. Queen Elizabeth II for a silver inset on a table to be presented to the City Livery Company in London.
- Bronze bust of Sir Viv Richards - also a full figure, presented to Viv by the West Indies Cricket Board in August 1991 to mark the end of his test career.
- Head of Lady Dorothy Cunningham
- Sculpture Of Torville & Dean 17.5" tall, sculpted after meeting the couple in 1993.
- Statuette of Rudolf Nureyev for Renaissance Editions
- Set of six spoons depicting Famous Brummies of the Past in sterling silver and silver plate for Bishtons of Birmingham.
