= List of public art in Worcestershire =

This is a list of public art in the Worcestershire county of England. This list applies only to works of public art on permanent display in an outdoor public space. For example, this does not include artworks in museums.

== Bewdley ==
Image	Title / subject	Location and coordinates	Date	Artist / designer	Type	Material	Dimensions	Designation	Owner / administrator	Notes
More images	Stanley Baldwin	Load Street, Bewdley 52.375577°N 2.315360°W	September 27, 2018	Martin Jennings	Statue	Bronze			Bewdley Town Council	UK Prime Minister and the Local Member of Parliament for nearly 30 years.

== Bromsgrove ==
Image	Title / subject	Location and coordinates	Date	Artist / designer	Type	Material	Dimensions	Designation	Owner / administrator	Notes
	A. E. Housman	High Street, Bromsgrove 52.335756°N 2.059679°W	1985	Kenneth Potts	Statue	Bronze	Statue: 225cm high approx. Base: 300cm high x 150cm wide approx.		Bromsgrove District Council	
More images	Dryad and Boar (cast of)	Outside Post Office, High Street, Bromsgrove 52.336330°N 2.059006°W	1983	Louis Wiegartner & Terry Simons	Statue, sculpture	Bronze			Bromsgrove District Council	A figure of a small curly haired boy wearing only a loin cloth.
More images	Green Man Walking	Sanders Park, Bromsgrove 52.333775°N 2.071606°W			Sculpture	Bronze			Bromsgrove District Council	Three pieces of an artwork, if you stand in the right place, an image of a man will be in the middle

== Droitwich Spa ==
=== Droitwich Canal ===
Image	Title / subject	Location and coordinates	Date	Artist / designer	Type	Material	Dimensions	Designation	Owner / administrator	Notes
More images	Lighting the Tunnel	Netherwich Canal Tunnel, Droitwich Canal 52.270737°N 2.154930°W	2007	Richard Ellis	Sculpture				Canal and River Trust	Artworks at Netherwich Canal Tunnel were designed by artist Richard Ellis with young people of Droitwich during 2007. Images of bats, spiders, butterflies etc

=== St Andrew's Square ===
Image	Title / subject	Location and coordinates	Date	Artist / designer	Type	Material	Dimensions	Designation	Owner / administrator	Notes
	Clay Mural	St Andrew's Square Square, Droitwich 52.267527°N 2.150102°W	1975	Philippa Threlfall	Mural	Clay			Droitwich Town Council and Wychavon District Council	Features the prominent buildings of Droitwich Spa, such as the Brine baths and Raven Hotel
	Droitwich Spa’s Roman history	St Andrew's Square Square, Droitwich 52.268045°N 2.150746°W	1976	Henry & Joyce Collins	Mural	silicon-coated reinforced concrete, with areas of the face enriched with mosaic and gold leaf	3m high x 7.3m long	not listed	Droitwich Town Council and Wychavon District Council	On the wall of Wilkinson's depicting the Roman History of Droitwich Spa until the early modern period
More images	Edward Winslow	St Andrew's Square Square, Droitwich 52.267894°N 2.150649°W		Sara Ingleby-Mackenzie	Statue	Bronze			Droitwich Town Council and Wychavon District Council	Founding father of America, set sail on the Mayflower in 1620

=== Victoria Square ===
Image	Title / subject	Location and coordinates	Date	Artist / designer	Type	Material	Dimensions	Designation	Owner / administrator	Notes
More images	Saltworkers	Victoria Square, Droitwich 52.267133°N 2.150007°W	1998	John McKenna	Statue	Bronze	240cm high		Droitwich Town Council and Wychavon District Council	It depicts a family of saltworkers involved in the process of manufacturing salt
More images	Droitwich Spa Bad Ems	Victoria Square, Droitwich 52.266811°N 2.150349°W	2008	In the style of Friedensreich Hundertwasser	Sculpture	glazed terracotta			Droitwich Town Council and Wychavon District Council	Unveiled on the 25th anniversary of the twinning of Droitwich Spa and Bad Ems. The towns were twinned in 1983

=== Vines Park ===
Image	Title / subject	Location and coordinates	Date	Artist / designer	Type	Material	Dimensions	Designation	Owner / administrator	Notes
	Saint Richard of Droitwich	Vines Park, Droitwich 52.269563°N 2.147963°W	1935		Statue	Stone			Droitwich Town Council and Wychavon District Council	

== Evesham ==
Image	Title / subject	Location and coordinates	Date	Artist / designer	Type	Material	Dimensions	Designation	Owner / administrator	Notes
	The Penny Whistle	Abbey Park, Evesham 52.090489°N 1.944592°W	2007	Tom Harvey	Wood carving sculpture	Wood			Wychavon District Council	Made to celebrate the start of the first Music Festival in Evesham in July 2007

== Kidderminster ==
Image	Title / subject	Location and coordinates	Date	Artist / designer	Type	Material	Dimensions	Designation	Owner / administrator	Notes
More images	Richard Baxter	St Mary's	1875	Thomas Brock	Statue on pedestal	Marble (statue) and granite (pedestal)		Grade II listed		Originally in the Bull Ring, Kidderminster, relocated in March 1967
More images	Rowland Hill	Junction of Vicar and Exchange Streets 52.386835°N 2.248483°W	1881	Thomas Brock	Statue on pedestal	Sicilian marble (statue) and Cornish grey granite (Pedestal)	2.45m high x 1.1m wide x 1.1m deep (statue) and 3.3m high x 1.9m x1.5m (Pedestal)	Grade II listed	Wyre Forest District Council	
More images	War memorial	Outside of St Mary's Church, Kidderminster	1922	Alfred Drury	Statue on pedestal with relief plaque	Bronze and limestone		Grade II		

== Malvern ==
Image	Title / subject	Location and coordinates	Date	Artist / designer	Type	Material	Dimensions	Designation	Owner / administrator	Notes
More images	Buzzards	Rose Bank Gardens 52.1098657°N 2.3305801°W	2013	Walenty Pytel	Statue	metal			Malvern Town Council	
More images	The Lark Ascending	Rose Bank Gardens 52.10933°N 2.33069°W	2017	Walenty Pytel	Statue	metal			Malvern Town Council	
	Enigma Fountain / Sir Edward Elgar	Belle Vue Island 52.1115679°N 2.3298681°W	2000	Rose Garrard	Statue and Fountain					
	Malvinha	Belle Vue Island 52.1111268°N 2.3298500°W	1998	Rose Garrard	Fountain					
	Hand of Peace	British Legion Barnards Green Garden of Remembrance 52.1084679°N 2.3123406°W	1999	Rose Garrard	Statue	Portland stone				

== Redditch ==
Image	Title / subject	Location and coordinates	Date	Artist / designer	Type	Material	Dimensions	Designation	Owner / administrator	Notes
More images	Fountain with Female Figure	Church Green, Redditch 52.308032°N 1.940664°W	1883		Fountain	Cast iron, painted green, cream and gold	600cm high approx		Redditch Borough Council	
	Unicorn	Unicorn Hill, Redditch 52.306825°N 1.942348°W	1998		Panel	Sandstone, crown and chain gold	240cm high x 125cm wide x 3cm deep		Redditch Borough Council	Depicts the rearing Unicorn of the Royal Coat of Arms
More images	Holocaust Memorial	Market Place, Redditch 52.306786°N 1.940470°W	2005	Andy DeComyn & Chase Lloyd	Sculpture	Concrete	2 Metres high		Redditch Borough Council	Chase Lloyd conceived the sculpture while still at school
	Allegorical Figures	Smallwood House, Redditch 52.308262°N 1.941082°W	1895		Panel	Stone	180cm high x 350cm wide approx		Redditch Borough Council	Above the former Smallwood Hospital Formerly the Redditch General Hospital (later known as Smallwood Hospital), it opened in 1895 and closed in 1986. It is now known as Smallwood House and is still used by the NHS.
More images	John Bonham	Mercian Square, Redditch 52.306873°N 1.940090°W	2018	Mark Richards	Statue	Bronze			Redditch Borough Council	He was the drummer in Led Zeppelin
More images	Springs Eternal 2016	Walter Stranz Square, Redditch 52.30525°N 1.93883°W	2017	Tim Tolkien	Sculpture	Steel			Redditch Borough Council	A tribute to Redditch's connection with the spring and wireform industry
	Redditch Coat of Arms	Redditch Town Hall, Walter Stranz Square, Redditch 52.30520°N 1.93861°W			Coat of arms				Redditch Borough Council	

== Upton-upon-Severn ==
Image	Title / subject	Location and coordinates	Date	Artist / designer	Type	Material	Dimensions	Designation	Owner / administrator	Notes
More images	Admiral Sir William Tennant	Site of the Old Church, Upton-upon-Severn 52.064114°N 2.217446°W			Bust	Bronze			Upton upon Severn Town Council	

== Worcester ==
=== Foregate Street and High Street ===
Image	Title / subject	Location and coordinates	Date	Artist / designer	Type	Material	Dimensions	Designation	Owner / administrator	Notes
	Queen Victoria	Shire Hall, Foregate Street, Worcester 52.196687°N 2.222545°W	1887	Thomas Brock	Statue	Grey granite plinth and white marble statue		Grade II listed	Worcester City Council	Commemorated 50 years of the Queen's reign
	Steam locomotive	Worcester Foregate Street Station, Worcester 52.195277°N 2.221566°W			sculpture	Bronze			Worcester City Council	
More images	Sir Edward Elgar	High Street near Lychgate, Worcester 52.189766°N 2.220341°W	1981	Kenneth Potts	Statue	Bronze	Statue: 2.44m high. Pedestal: 1.18m high, 93cm x 92cm		Worcester City Council	
More images	Worcester Guildhall	High Street, Worcester 52.191175°N 2.220670°W	1724	Thomas White	Building with statues	Stone, some gilding and red paint		Grade I listed	Worcester City Council	Features statues of Charles I, Charles II and Anne
	King John	Copenhagen Street, Worcester 52.190815°N 2.221158°W	1966	Anita Lafford	Statue	plaster painted black	2 x 1.47m		Worcester City Council	Local historian Michael Grundy suggested it maybe of Leofric King of Mercia. King Richard I has also been suggested. King John is buried in Worcester Cathedral

=== Worcester Cathedral ===
Image	Title / subject	Location and coordinates	Date	Artist / designer	Type	Material	Dimensions	Designation	Owner / administrator	Notes
	South Africa War Memorial	Worcester Cathedral - College Yard, Worcester 52.189264°N 2.220468°W	1908	Robert Colton	War memorial	Bronze		Grade II* listed	Worcester City Council	A memorial of the Worcestershire lives lost from the war of 1899-1902 in South Africa
More images	Statues on North Side of Worcester Cathedral	North side of Worcester Cathedral 52.188266°N 2.220977°W		Redfern	Statues	Stone		Grade I listed	Worcester Cathedral	

=== Other areas ===
Image	Title / subject	Location and coordinates	Date	Artist / designer	Type	Material	Dimensions	Designation	Owner / administrator	Notes
More images	Needle Point	Worcester Shrub Hill Station - Worcester 52.193952°N 2.210204°W	2001	Paul Juillerat	Sculpture	Stainless steel	5m high		Worcester City Council	It is a symbol of Worcester past and present. Installed in August 2002. Made in Bristol.
More images	Swan of Kleve	Kleve Walk near the River Severn, Worcester 52.189733°N 2.223368°W	2001	Dieter von Levetzow	sculpture	Column: stone. Swan: Bronze alloy, natural patina, dark bronze colour	Column: 2.04m high, 45cm diameter. Swan: 50cm high, wingtip to wingtip measurement 1.2m approx.		Worcester City Council	Statue of a swan presented to Worcester by the citizens of Kleve
More images	Commemorative Poppy Sculpture	Cripplegate Park, Worcester 52.190278°N 2.228332°W	2016	Victoria Harrison	sculpture				Worcester City Council	Represent's the Worcestershire Yeomanry (The Queen's Own Worcestershire Hussars)
More images	Sustrans Portrait Bench	Near Diglis Bridge River Severn, Worcester 52.17644°N 2.22573°W	2013		sculpture	Metal			Sustrans	Statue of Ernest Payne, Sir Charles Hastings, Royalist Soldier, Roundheads
More images	Action at Fort Royal - Battle of Worcester	Fort Royal Park, Worcester 52.187542°N 2.214668°W	2013		Sculpture	Bronze			Worcester City Council	Commemorates the Battle of Worcester at Fort Royal on 3 September 1651
