= James Lofthouse (pharmacist) =

British pharmacist and founder of Fisherman's Friend

- Born: James Lofthouse; 17 May 1841; Lancaster, Lancashire, United Kingdom
- Died: 21 May 1906 (aged 65); Fleetwood, Lancashire
- Resting place: Fleetwood Cemetery
- Education: Lancaster Royal Grammar School
- Occupations: Pharmacist, Chemist
- Known for: Founding Fisherman's Friend
- Spouse: Elizabeth Nowell (m. 1877)
- Honours: Queen's Award for Export Achievement

James Lofthouse (17 May 1841 – 21 May 1906) was a British pharmacist and chemist. He is known for founding Fisherman's Friend, a brand of menthol lozenges.

== Early life ==
James Lofthouse was born on 17 May 1841 in Lancaster, Lancashire, to Edward Lofthouse and Elizabeth Parker. He attended Lancaster Royal Grammar School. Lofthouse pursued a career in pharmacy, qualifying as a chemist and druggist.

== Career ==
By 1865 Lofthouse had established a chemist at 103 Lord Street in Fleetwood. He began to encounter local fishermen suffering from bad coughs and croaking voices caused by the extreme cold and salty air out at sea. In response, he developed a liquid in 1865 using a blend of menthol, eucalyptus and liquorice. It was initially dispensed in small glass bottles that the fishermen began to call their friends.

However, these glass bottles frequently broke on the high seas. Lofthouse decided to thicken the tincture into a paste and dry it to create small, portable lozenges. These lozenges were easier to transport and eventually became the standard form of the product. While the remedy remained a local success for nearly a century, sold at his Lofthouse Chemist shop, it would eventually become the Lofthouse of Fleetwood company.

== Personal life ==
Lofthouse married Elizabeth Nowell on 26 March 1877 in St Paul’s Church, Burnley. He also had several children. His sons, Alan Lofthouse and James Lofthouse Jr, both followed their father into pharmacy, and Alan eventually took over the management of the family business. Their daughter Florence also assisted in the shop.

== Death ==
Lofthouse died on 21 May 1906 at the age of 65, in Fleetwood. He was buried in the older section of Fleetwood Cemetery.
