= The Chimes, Uxbridge =

Coordinates: 51°32′46″N 0°28′32″W

The Chimes
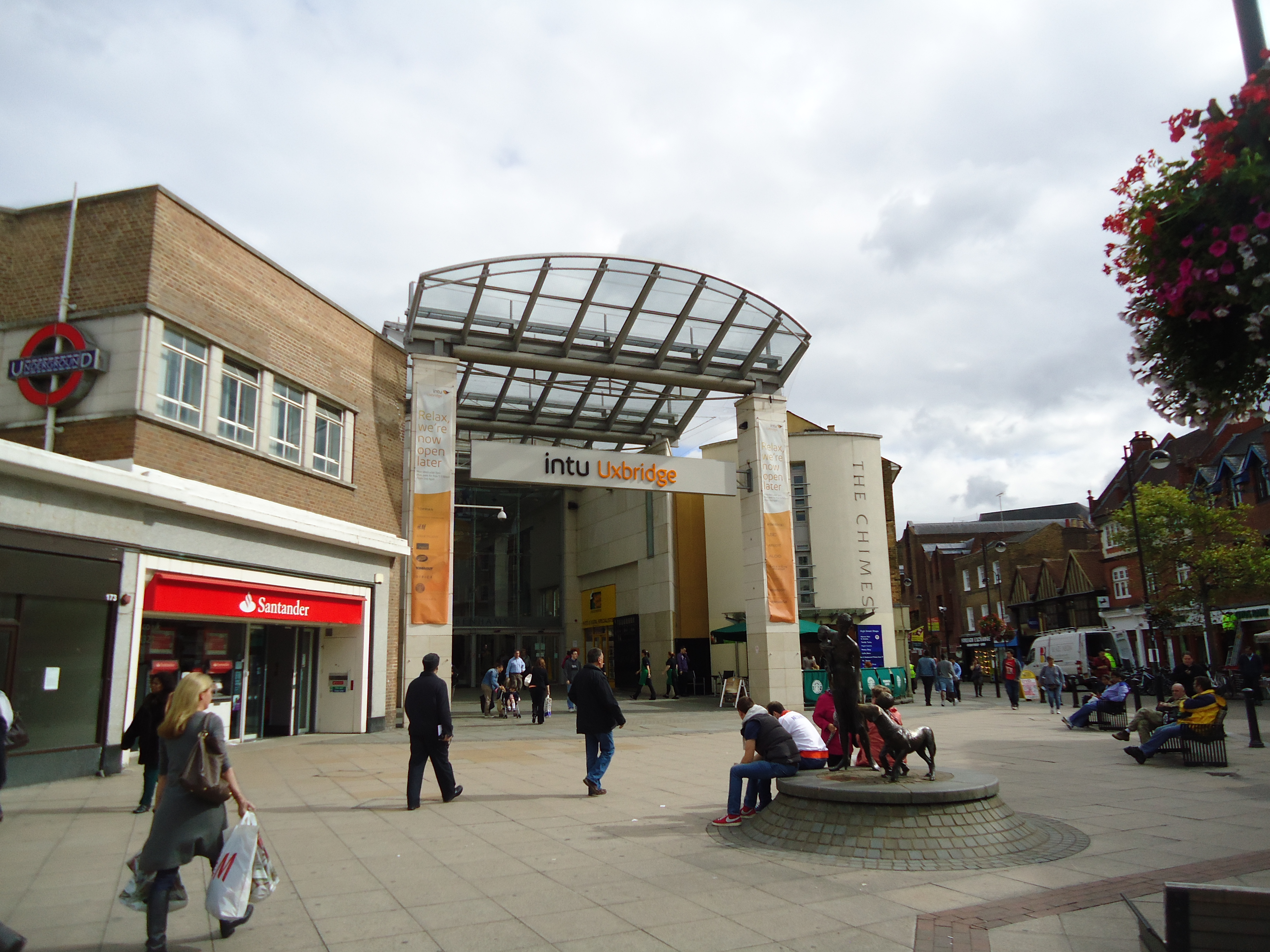
- The shopping centre entrance
- Location: Uxbridge, Greater London, England
- Opened: 28 February 2001
- Manager: abrdn
- Owner: Malaysian pension fund Kumpulan Wang Persaraan (Diperbadankan) (80%); Savills (20%)
- Num. of stores: 82
- Num. of anchor tenants: 6
- Floor area: 440,000 square feet (41,000 m^{2})
- Floors: 3
- Parking: 1,600
- Website: chimesuxbridge.co.uk

The Chimes is a shopping centre in Uxbridge, within the London Borough of Hillingdon, owned by the Malaysian pension fund Kumpulan Wang Persaraan (Diperbadankan). Opened in February 2001, the centre includes 71 stores, cafes and restaurants, including Boots, H&M and Next as anchor stores. A multi-screen Odeon cinema with an IMAX screen is also part of the centre. A number of existing old buildings in Uxbridge High Street were restored and incorporated into the new shopping centre, which was designed with the intention of it blending into its surroundings.

The centre was formerly named Intu Uxbridge between 2013 and 2021 under the ownership and management of Intu Properties, prior to the collapse of that company.

== Construction ==
Former logo of The Chimes

Planning for the shopping centre began in the 1990s, under the proposed name of St George's, although another development in Harrow at the time subsequently took the name.

The new development, bordered by the High Street and Chippendale Waye was built beside Uxbridge tube station and incorporated many of the existing buildings on one side of the High Street. The George Street car park, a joinery works, builders' yard, garages and a row of houses on Chippendale Waye were demolished to make way for the construction, Chippendale Waye was widened to become a dual carriageway to support the extra traffic expected once the centre opened. Bronze Age remains were found during initial excavations as part of an archaeological investigation of the site, dating from before 700 BC.

The development in Uxbridge of what would become The Mall Pavilions shopping centre in the 1970s had seen the demolition of a large area of the opposite end of the High Street in favour of an open shopping development, but was widely considered to have been unsuccessful. During the 1980s, the centre was refurbished and a roof was built. During the planning for The Chimes, developers with encouragement from the London Borough of Hillingdon sought instead to avoid such a move by retaining many of the original old buildings in the High Street.

The name The Chimes was eventually chosen by the developers as a reference to the sound of the bells from the market house on the High Street nearby, which were traditionally rung to announce the opening of the town's market.

A statue, named "Anticipation", featuring a woman, child and dog was unveiled near the front entrance of the centre on 25 June 2002 by Elizabeth II and the Prince Philip. The statue had been commissioned by Hillingdon Arts Association and was created by Anita Lafford. Her design was chosen in March 2001 following an open competition which began in January 2000.

Clarke Nicholls Marcel (CNM London) were the civil & structural engineers for the new-build shopping centre.

== Since opening ==
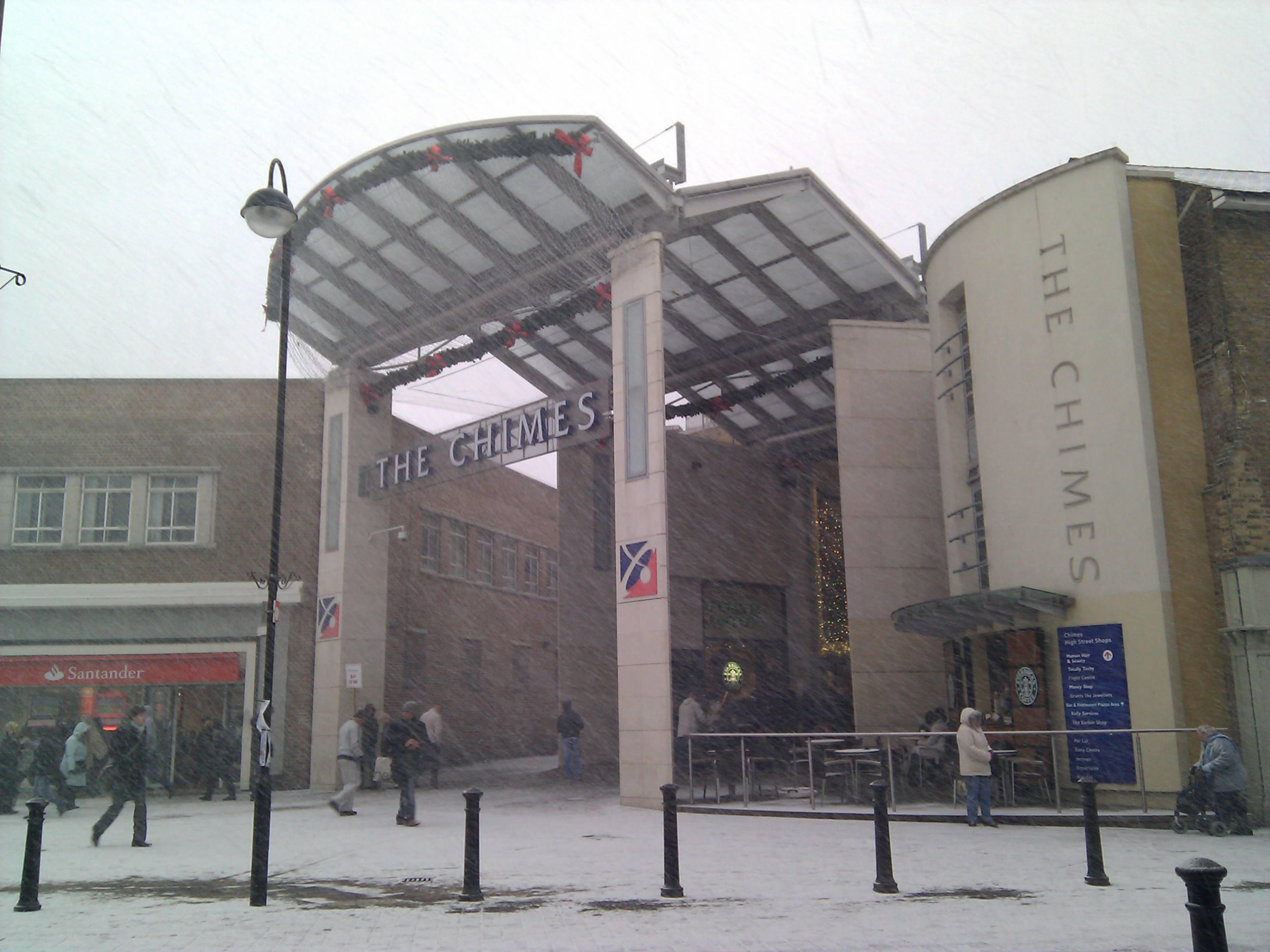
The Chimes entrance in 2010

Anchor stores including Boots and Debenhams were established in the centre, as was a multi-screen Odeon cinema. The 19th century-built offices of the local building company Fassnidge were also refurbished and included in the new development, becoming a PizzaExpress restaurant. A new public area known as the piazza was developed in front of the Fassnidge building, and a second restaurant was built beside it, using preserved timber salvaged during the demolition of older buildings in Uxbridge in earlier years. The new restaurant was designed to resemble a Tudor-style house.

The tenth anniversary of the opening of The Chimes was celebrated in February 2011, at which time it was said to be attracting 12 million customers each year.

The centre was renamed "Intu Uxbridge" in 2013, following the renaming of parent Capital Shopping Centres Group plc to Intu Properties plc.

In June 2014, Intu Properties sold an 80% majority stake in the centre to the Malaysian pension fund Kumpulan Wang Persaraan for £175 million. Under the terms of the sale, Intu retained 20% and continued to manage the centre.

The centre was changed back to its original name of "The Chimes" on 28 January 2021.

== Stores ==
Stores in the centre include Lidl, Accessorize, Boots, River Island, Sunglass Hut, Hotel Chocolat, Skechers, Ernest Jones, Pandora, ToyTown, Next, Next Home, TK Maxx, JD Sports and Clintons. A number of independent stores, as well as restaurants and a multi-screen Odeon IMAX cinema are also within the centre.

== In popular culture ==
The Chimes was used to film scenes for the Channel 4 television comedy The Inbetweeners, offering itself as a shooting location on just three days' notice after another shopping centre withdrew.
