= St Anns (Harrow) =

Shopping centre in London, England

Coordinates: 51°34′50.53″N 0°20′11.55″W

St Anns Shopping Centre, Harrow

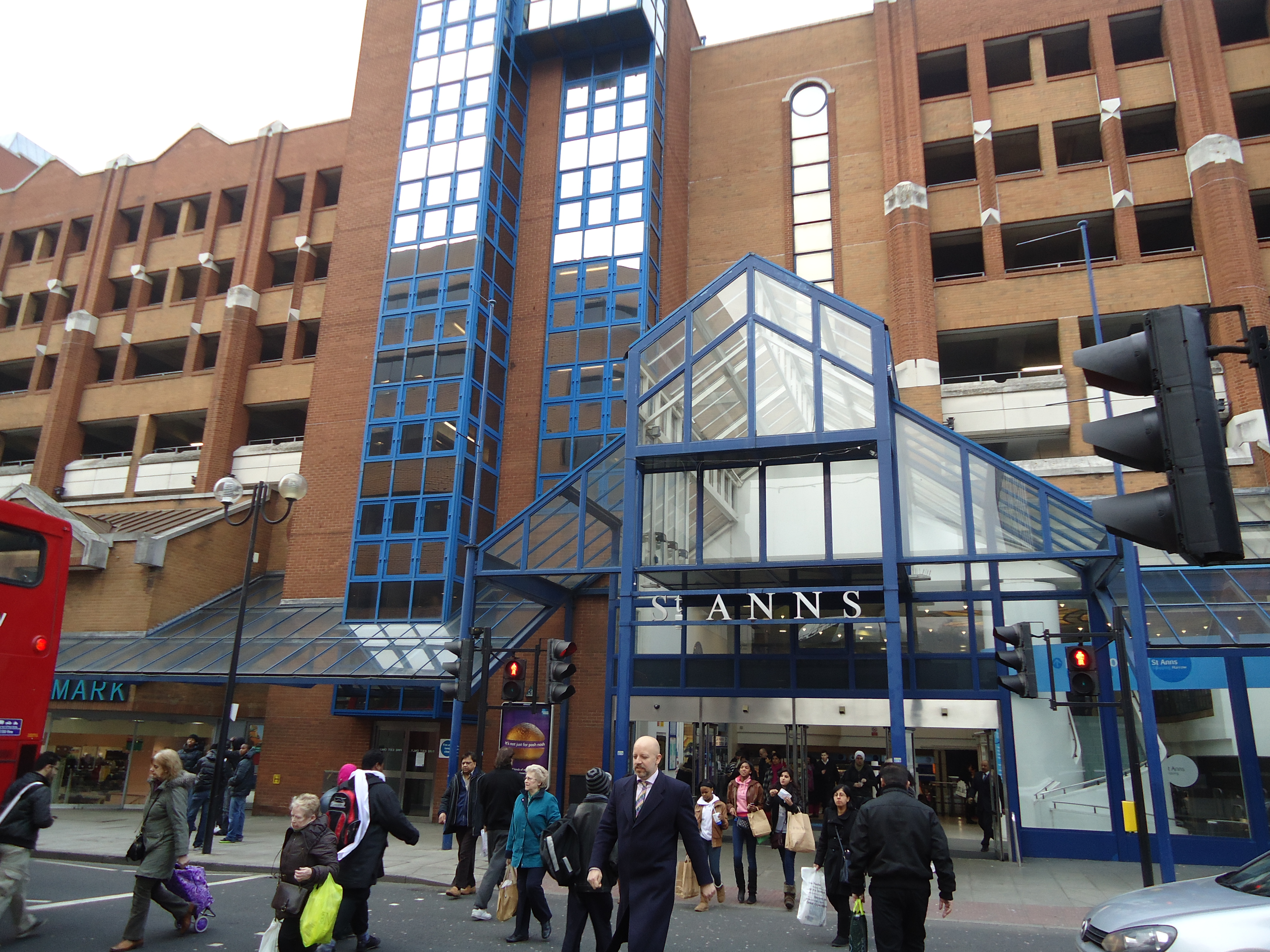
- College Road entrance
- Location: Harrow, England
- Opened: 24 September 1987; 39 years ago
- Owner: RPMI
- Num. of stores: 40
- Floor area: 280,000 sq ft (26,000 m^{2})
- Floors: 2
- Parking: 940 spaces
- Website: www.stannsshopping.co.uk

St. Anns is a shopping centre in Harrow town centre in Greater London, England. It has two entrances, one on College Road opposite Harrow-on-the-Hill station and another on the pedestrianised St Anns Road. The centre was opened in 1987 and currently covers 280,000 square feet of retail space.

Like the St Anns Road street it is on, the centre does not officially use an apostrophe for "Ann".

== History ==
The shopping centre was officially opened by Diana, Princess of Wales on 18 November 1987. Many buildings were demolished to make way for the centre, including Heathfield School for Girls, which moved to Pinner in 1982, and the old Greenhill School – the site of which is now occupied by Marks & Spencer.

The steps at the St Anns Road entrance were removed in the mid-2010s to improve accessibility, which included repaving of the road.

== Stores ==
St Anns is home to over 40 high street brands including H&M, Primark, M&S, Boots and WHSmith, along with a dedicated food court on the second floor which includes a Burger King, Pizza Hut, KFC, Treatz Desert Palour and Subway.

The large Primark store was originally British Home Stores (BHS) until the retailer's collapse in 2016. Primark moved from its original smaller location at the centre which was originally a C&A store before it was bought by Primark following C&A's departure from the British market. Following the Primark move, a Lidl supermarket took its place in 2019.

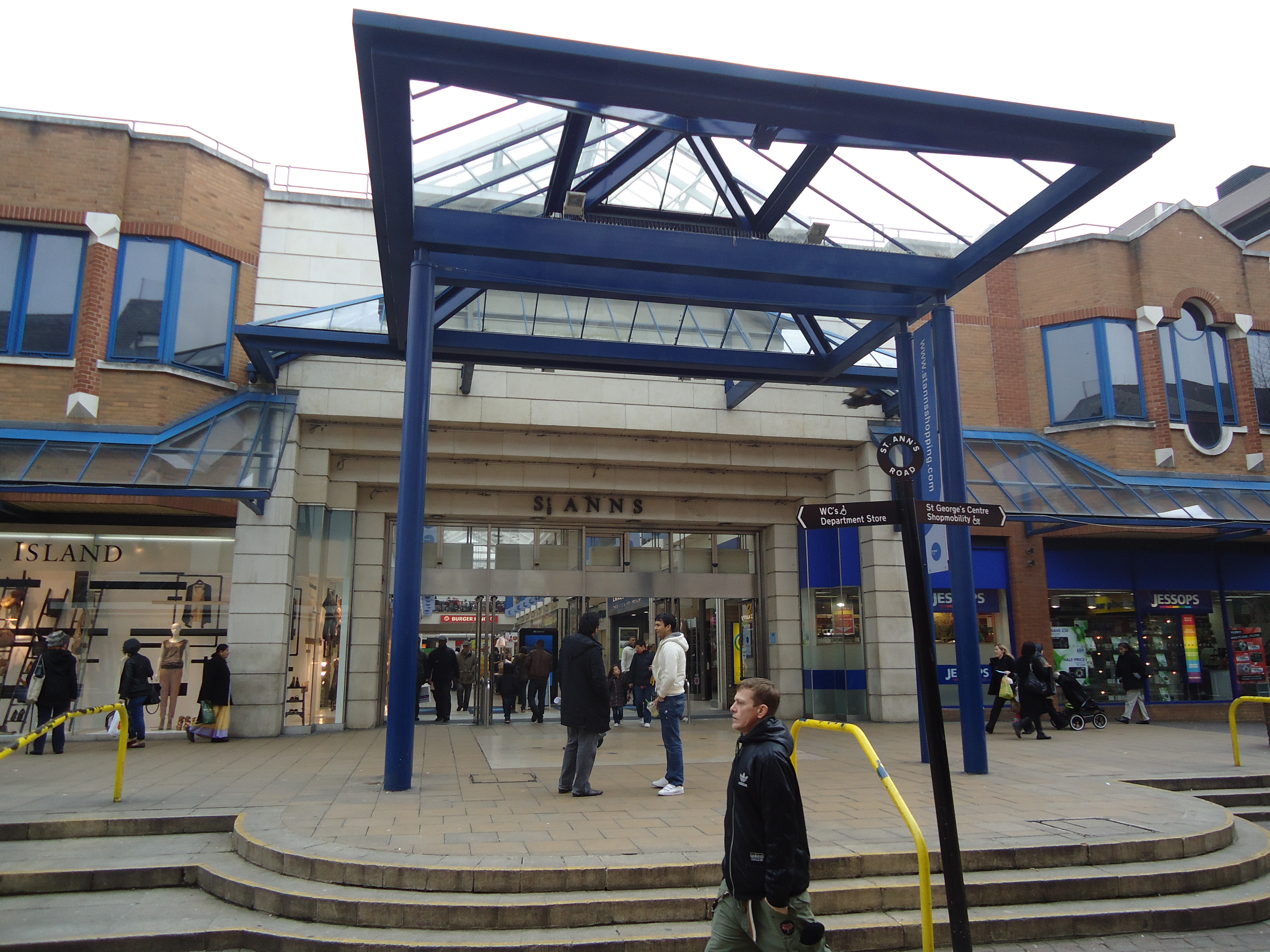
Entrance from St Anns Road (2011)

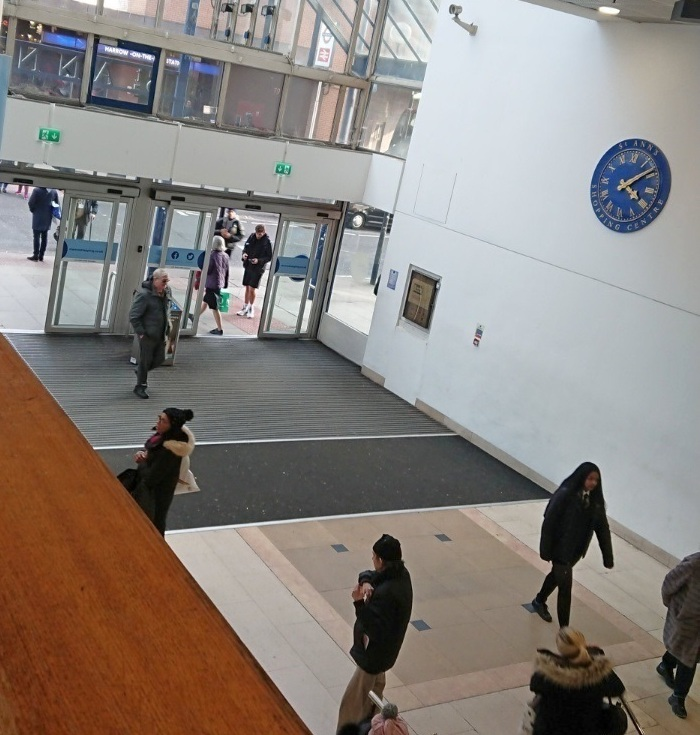
Inside St Anns shopping centre facing the College Road entrance

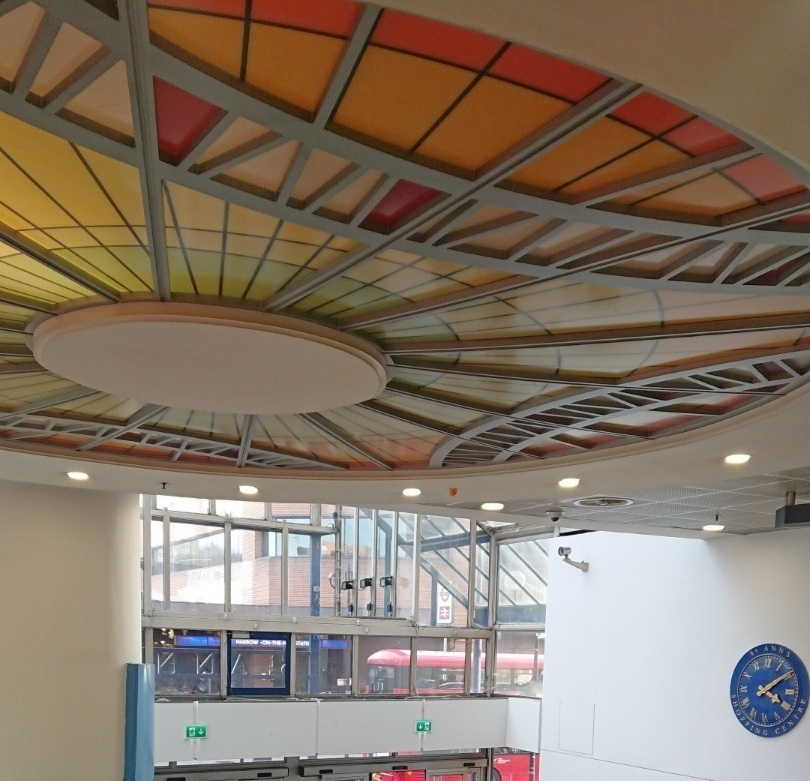
Ceiling design

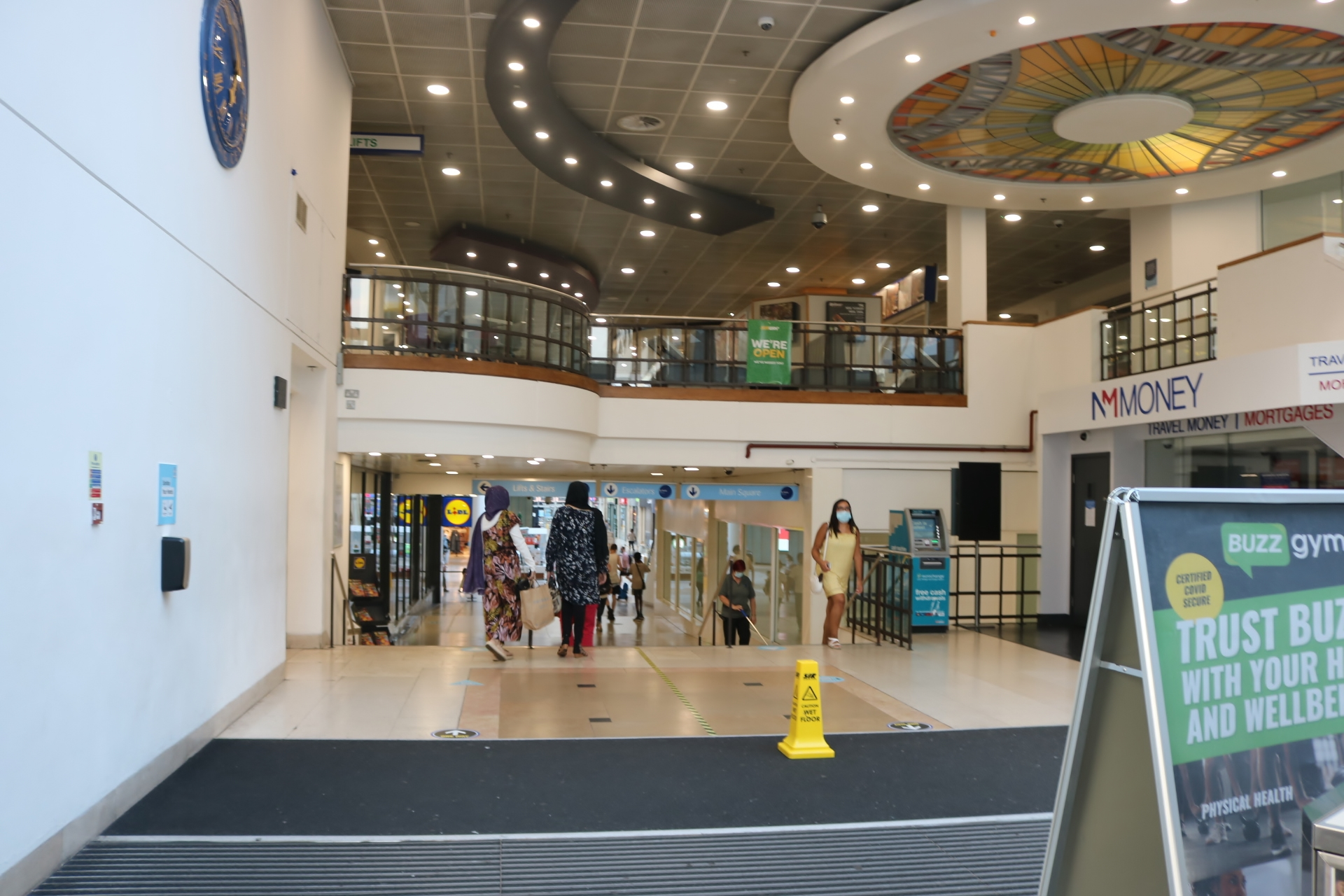
Entrance from College Road

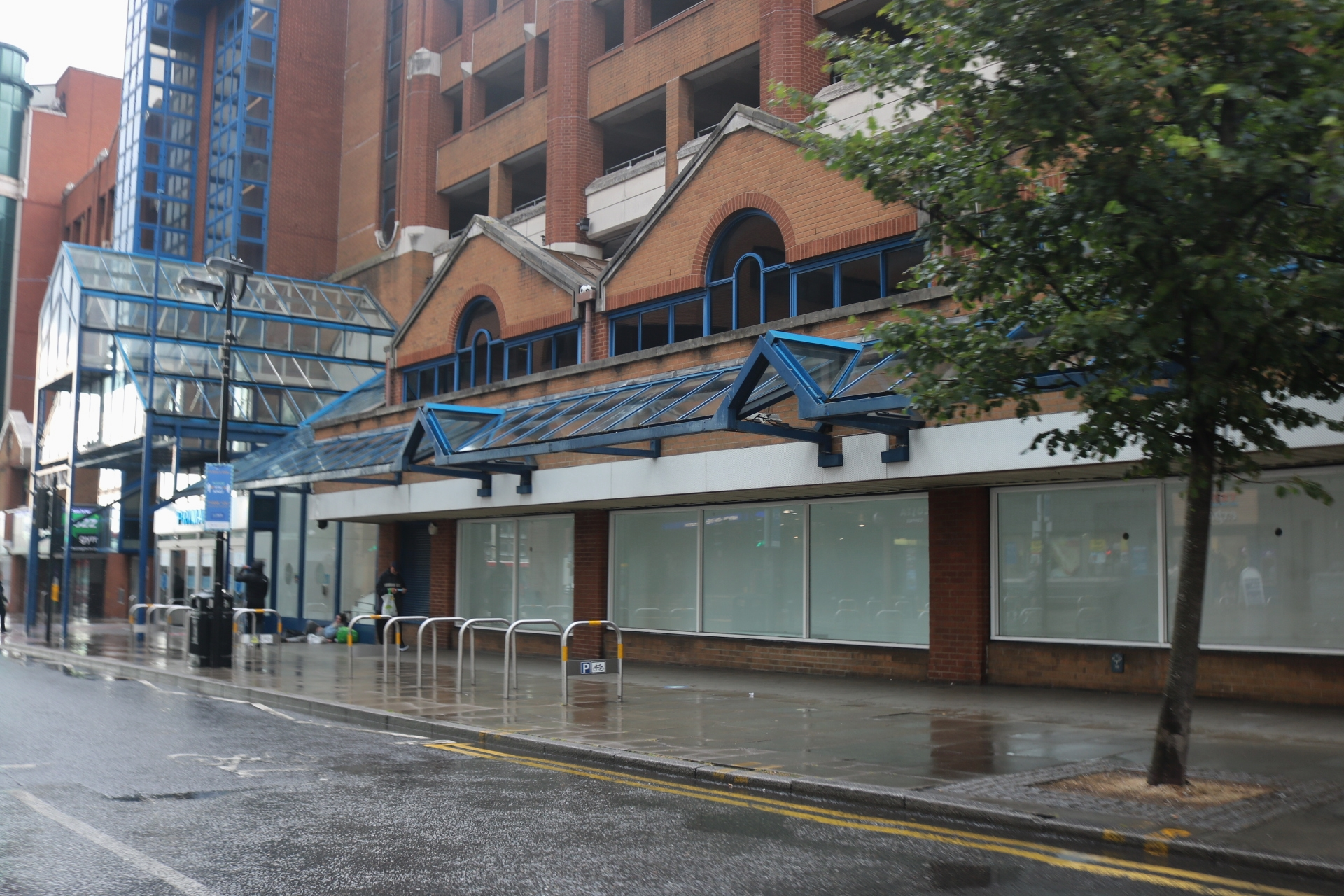
College Road exterior

== See also ==
- St George's Shopping Centre, Harrow
