= St George's Church, Worcester =

St George's Church
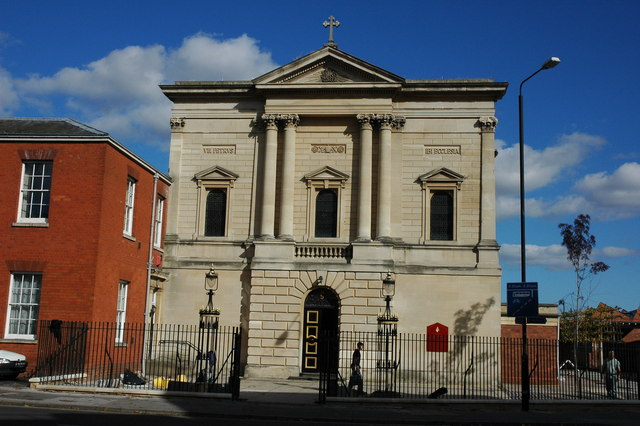
- St George's Church
- 52.1947°N 2.2195°W
- OS grid reference: SO 85091 55182
- Location: Worcester
- Country: England
- Denomination: Roman Catholic
- Website: CatholicWorcester.org

History
- Status: Active
- Founded: 1829
- Founder: Society of Jesus
- Dedication: Saint George

Architecture
- Functional status: Church
- Heritage designation: Grade II* listed
- Designated: 22 May 1954
- Architect: Henry Rowe

Administration
- Province: Birmingham
- Archdiocese: Birmingham
- Deanery: Worcester

St George's Church is a Roman Catholic Parish church in Worcester. It was founded in 1829 and was administered by the Society of Jesus until 1990 when it was handed over to the Archdiocese of Birmingham. It is in the Baroque style, is a Grade II* listed building and was where Edward Elgar was organist from 1885.

== History ==
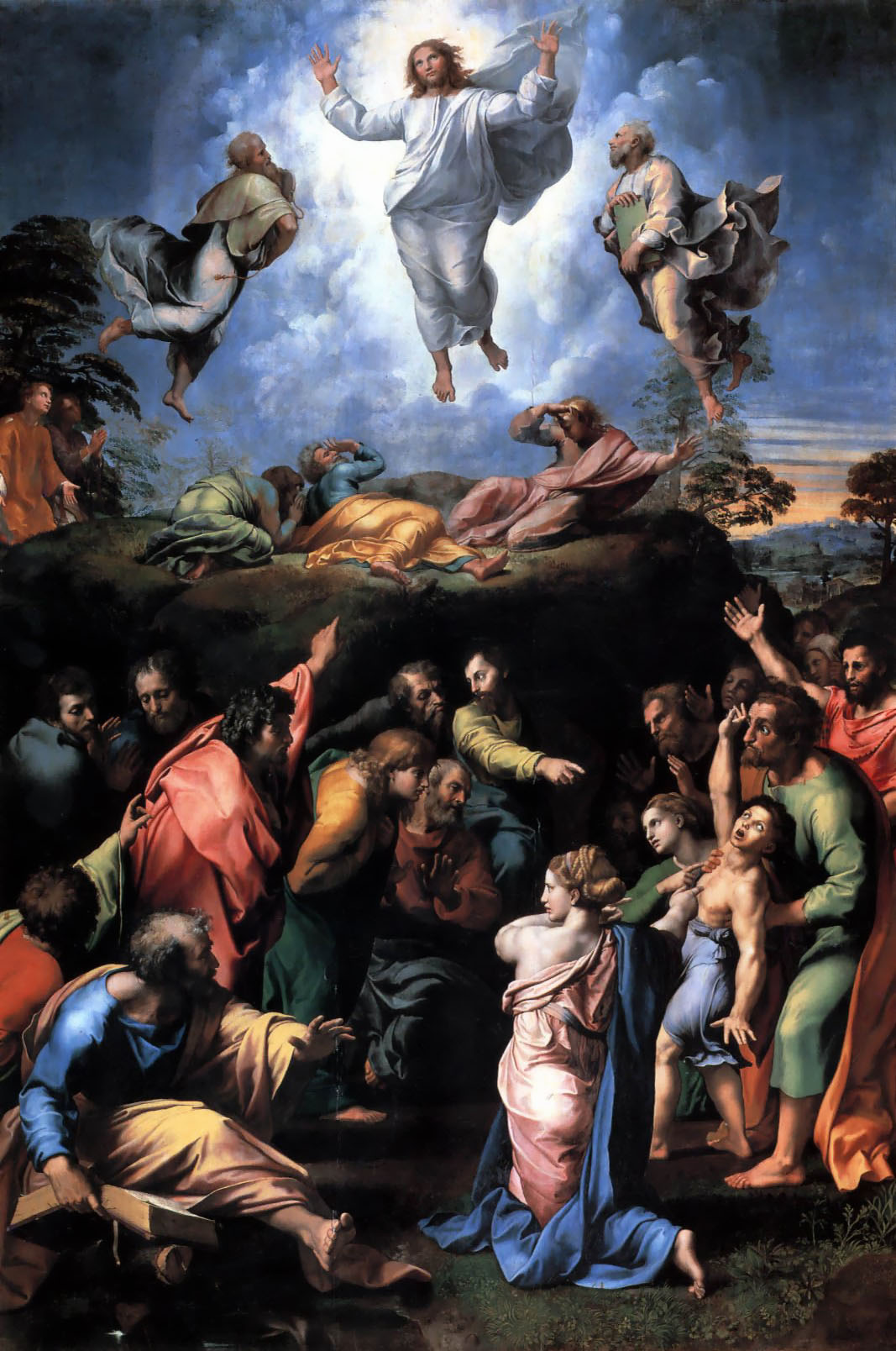
Raphael's Transfiguration, a copy hangs behind the altar

There was another, earlier, church built on the same site in 1729, but little is known about it. From 1623, for their own administrative purposes the Jesuits divided the country into 'residences' and St George's church was named after the 'residence' that covered Warwickshire and Worcestershire, St George's.

The church was opened on 16 July 1829 by, the Vicar Apostolic of the Midland District, Bishop Thomas Walsh and was designed by Henry Rowe.

Later that century, in 1880 the church was extended and the facade was heightened seven years later, to the designs of S. J. Nicoll, who also designed the interior of the Jesuit staffed Church of Saint Francis Xavier in Liverpool.

Behind the altar is a large-scale copy of Raphael's Transfiguration. The original is significant to the city of Worcester because it was commissioned by Cardinal Giulio de' Medici in 1517. Cardinal Medici went on become the titular Bishop of Worcester from 1520 to 1522 and was elected as Pope Clement VII in 1523. The copy was presented to the church in 1837 by The 16th Earl of Shrewsbury.

== Organ ==
The organ was installed in 1885, the same year that the English composer Edward Elgar became the church organist. He succeeded his father at the age of 27, being assistant organist from the age of 15. He was organist at the church for four further years. The organ was rebuilt in 1970 by Nicholson & Co (Worcester) Ltd, and the stops that were from the old organ were marked 'E' to indicate what Elgar used when he played it.

== Parish ==
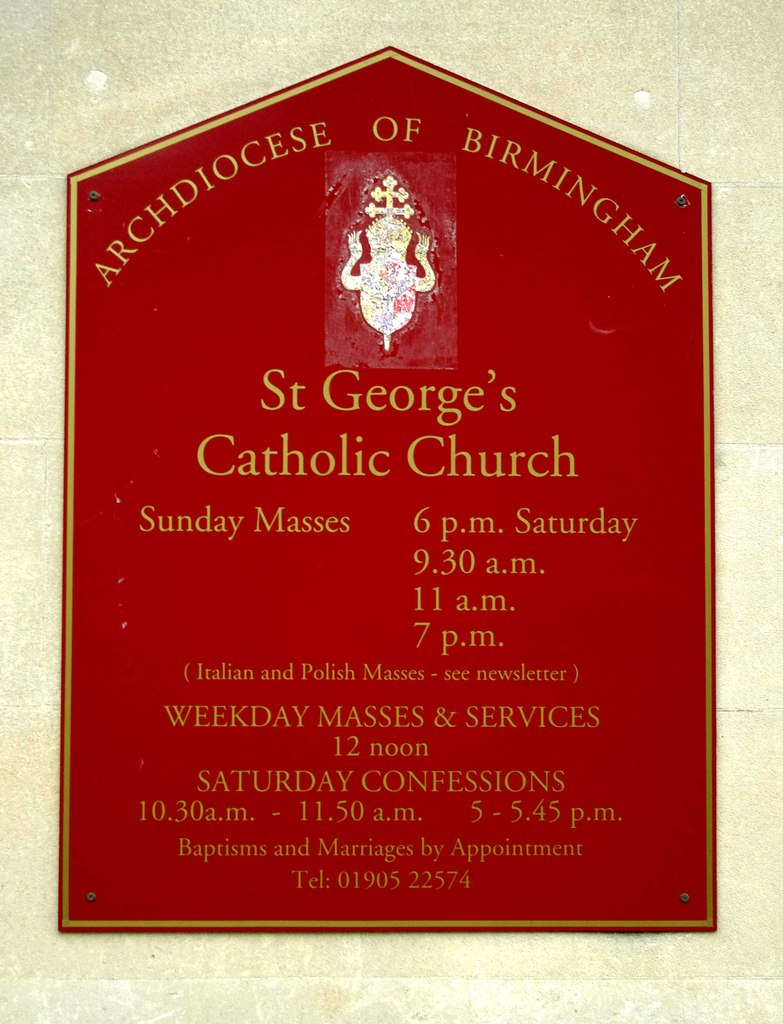
Notice board in 2011

The church has 2 Sunday Masses: Sunday at 8:45am and 11:00am. Furthermore, there are usually weekday Masses at 10:00am, Monday to Saturday. Confession can be heard on Saturday from 11:00am to 12.00pm

The parish also has a relationship with the nearby St George's Catholic Primary School which states on its website that 'We are proud of our links to St George's Catholic Church, Worcester, where Elgar was an organist for many years.'

== See also ==
- Society of Jesus
- Worcester
- Archdiocese of Birmingham
