= St George's Shopping Centre, Harrow =

Shopping centre in London, England

St George's Shopping Centre

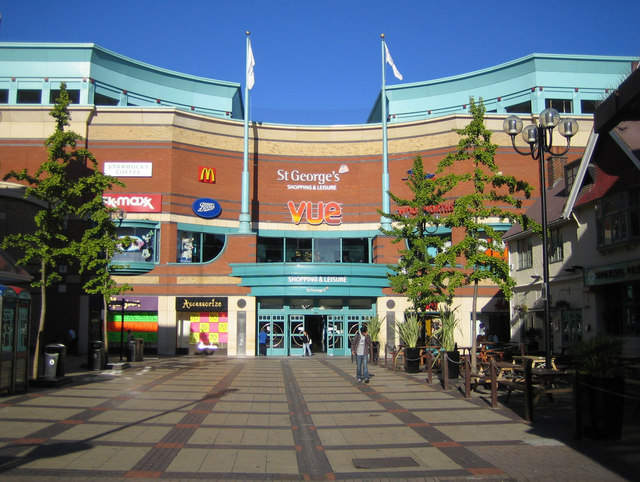
- Shopping centre in 2007
- Location: St Ann's Road, Harrow HA1 1HS, England
- Coordinates: 51.5814°N 0.3392°W
- Opened: 23 April 1996; 30 years ago
- Developer: Boots Properties
- Manager: Savills
- Owner: Pension fund clients of LaSalle Global Partner Solutions
- Num. of stores: 32
- Floor area: 215,000 sq ft (20,000 m^{2})
- Floors: 2 main retail levels, with upper leisure space and 3 parking levels above
- Parking: 643 spaces, including 26 Blue Badge spaces
- Public transit: Harrow-on-the-Hill station
- Website: www.stgeorgesshopping.co.uk

St George's is a covered shopping centre in Harrow, Greater London. It opened on St George's Day in 1996 as St George's Shopping and Leisure Centre. The centre is located on St Ann's Road in Harrow town centre, close to but separate from St Anns shopping centre. The centre has about 215,000 sq ft (20,000 m^{2}) of retail, food and leisure space, with shops mainly on two levels, leisure uses above and upper-level car parking. As of 2022, it had 32 retail units and an annual footfall of about nine million customers.

== History ==
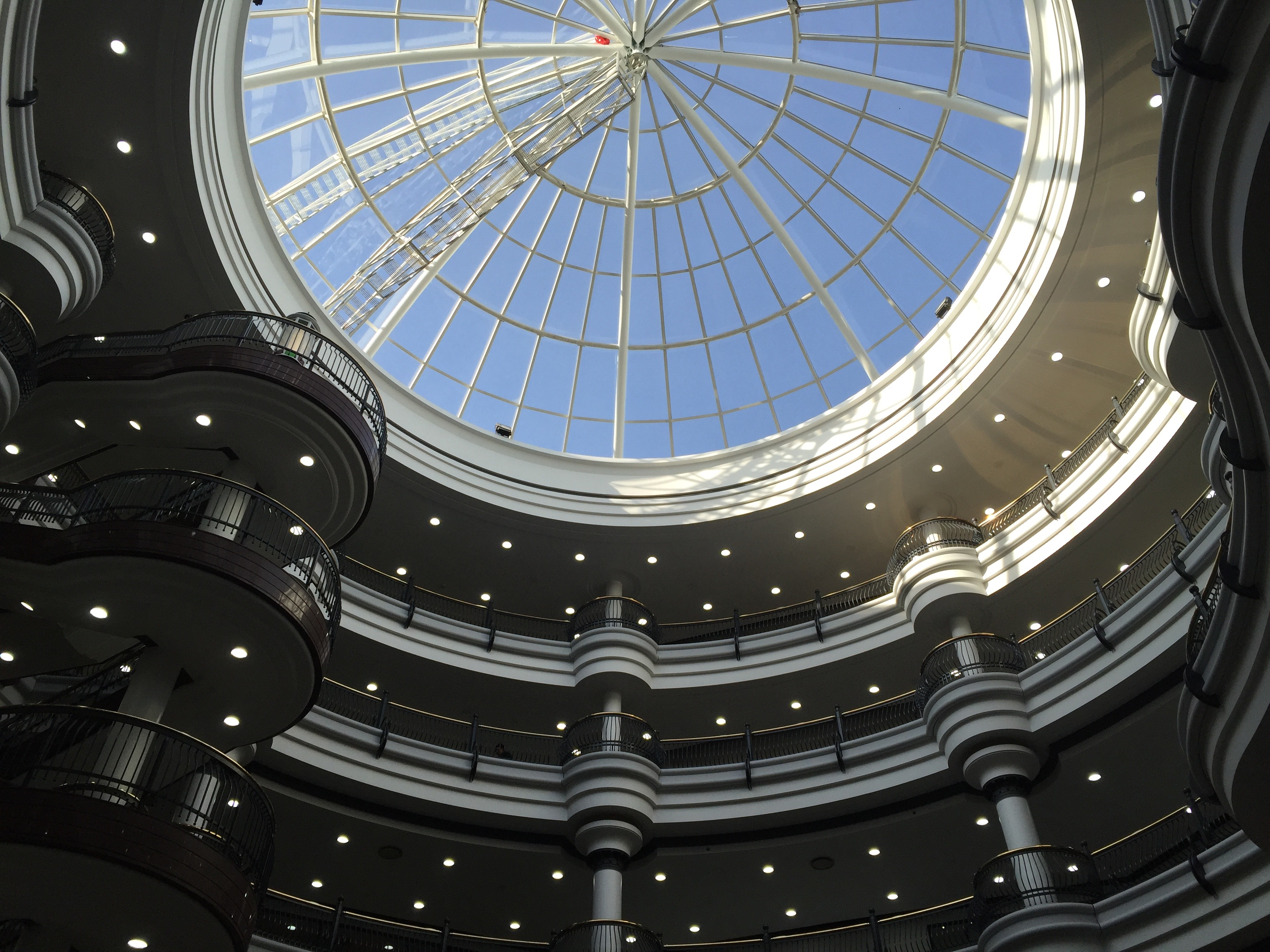
Looking up inside the St George's centre

St George's was built on the site of a former furniture store called Adam's. The building had previously housed the Harrow Empire and Picturedrome, which opened in 1910 and closed in 1914.

The centre was developed by Boots Properties at a cost of about £40 million and opened on St George's Day 1996 as St George's Shopping and Leisure Centre. It launched with stores including Virgin Megastore, Disney Store, and a McDonald's that remains as one of two branches in the town centre.

The centre's cinema opened on 26 April 1996 as the Warner Cinema with 9 screens. It was later rebranded as Warner Village Cinemas and has operated as Vue Harrow since 2004, later expanding to 12 screens.

Legal & General agreed to buy the centre in 2002 for around £49 million. It was later acquired from Legal & General by Glenn Maud's investment vehicle PropInvest for £76.5 million. In 2011 it was acquired by Redefine International (later trading as RDI REIT) for £68 million.

The centre was refurbished in 2016. HFM Architects' work included a new limestone entrance portal with illuminated signage and automatic sliding doors, raised shopfront heights, new timber-faced ventilation grilles and soffits, and redecoration and decluttering of the atrium.

In 2021, Axis Retail Partners, acting in partnership with Generali, acquired St George's from RDI REIT on behalf of three pension fund clients of LaSalle Global Partner Solutions. The acquisition was supported by a £20.5 million loan from OakNorth Bank.

== Facilities ==
St George's comprises about 215,000 sq ft (20,000 m^{2}) of retail, food and leisure space across more than 30 units, with retail accommodation mainly over two levels, upper leisure space and three levels of parking above. As of 2022, it had 32 retail units and annual footfall of about nine million customers. At the time of the 2021 acquisition, the centre held a BREEAM In-Use rating of "Very Good".

As of 2026, major retail and leisure occupiers included Boots, B&M, Deichmann, McDonald's, TK Maxx, H&M, Vision Express and Vue Harrow.

The car park entrance is on Headstone Road and has 643 spaces, including 26 Blue Badge spaces.

The centre is about five minutes' walk from Harrow-on-the-Hill station, which is served by the Metropolitan line and Chiltern Railways. Accessibility features include level access at the St Ann's Road entrance, lift access between floors, accessible toilets and Shopmobility provision including manual wheelchairs, powered wheelchairs and powered scooters.

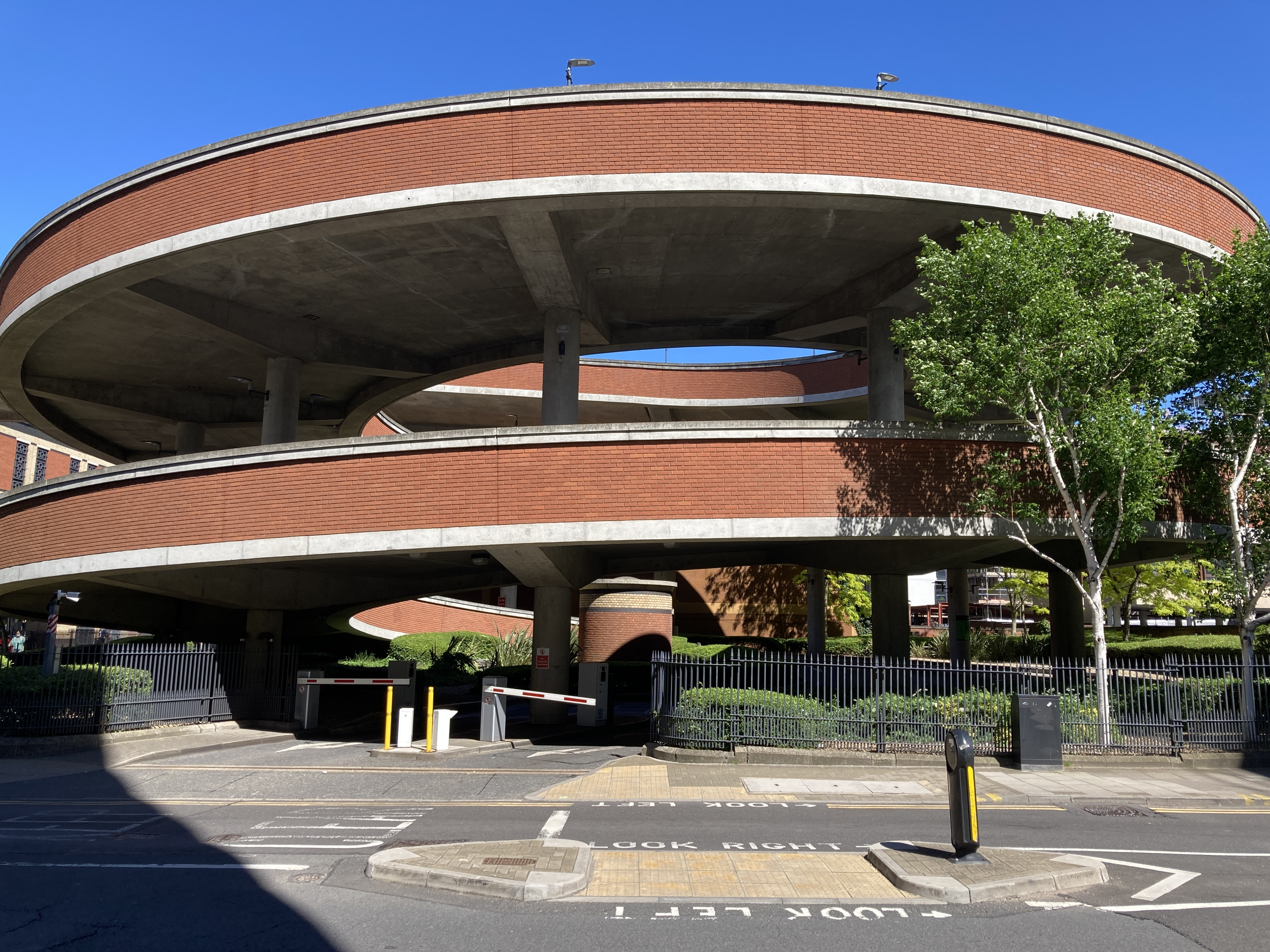
Entrance to car park

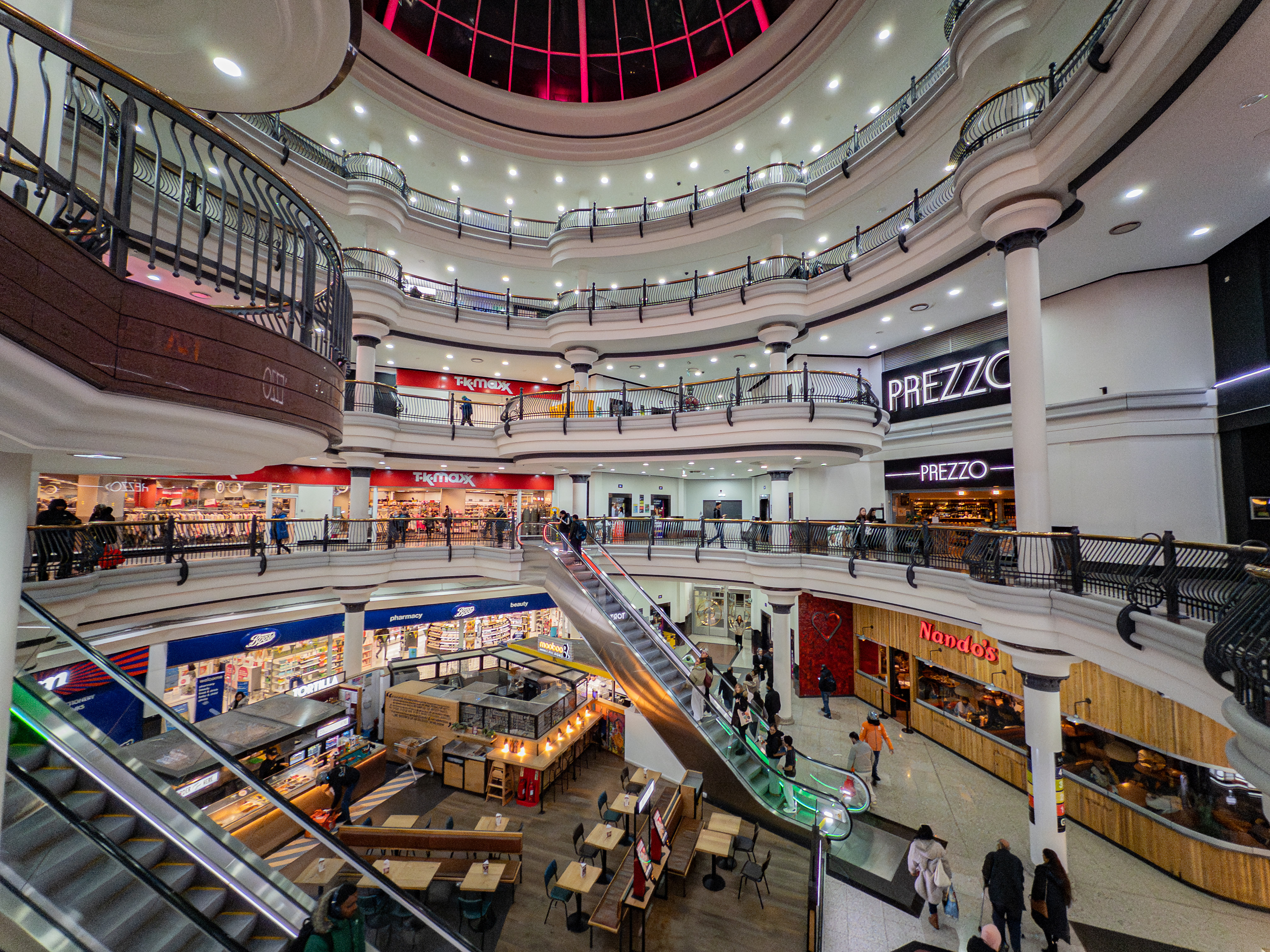
Interior view

== Public art ==
The centre contains Seven Panels on the Theme of St. George, the Dragon and the Maiden, a series of seven metallic resin relief panels by the British sculptor Gerald Laing. The work was commissioned by Boots Properties for St George's Centre, Harrow, and is dated 1995 in Laing's catalogue raisonné. The panels are positioned high on the centre's walls and depict a modern version of the legend of Saint George and the Dragon.
