= Fisherman's Friend =

Brand of menthol lozenges

The image of the mid-water side trawler Cevic FD.241 which appears on all Fisherman's Friend products

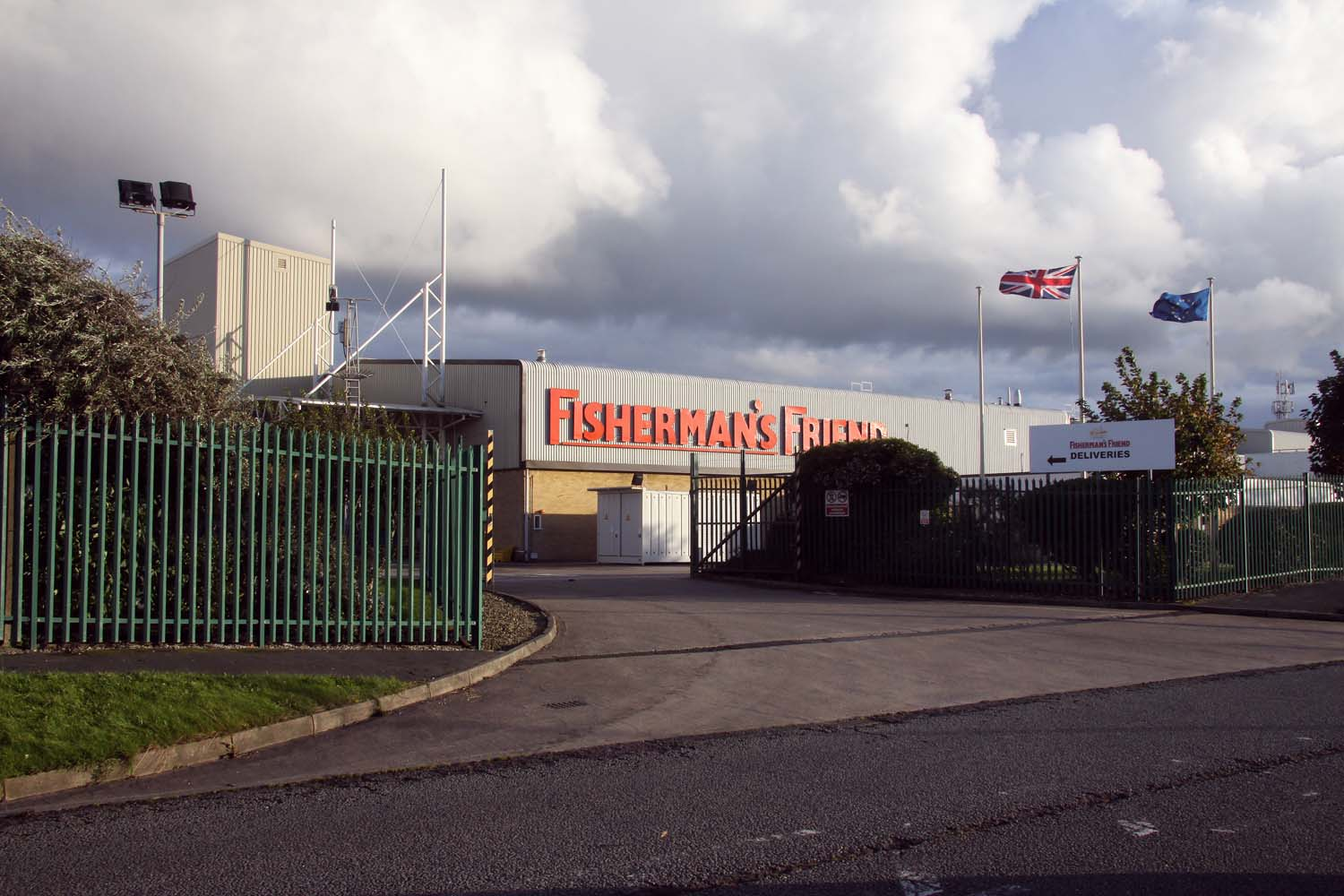
The company's factory in Fleetwood, Lancashire

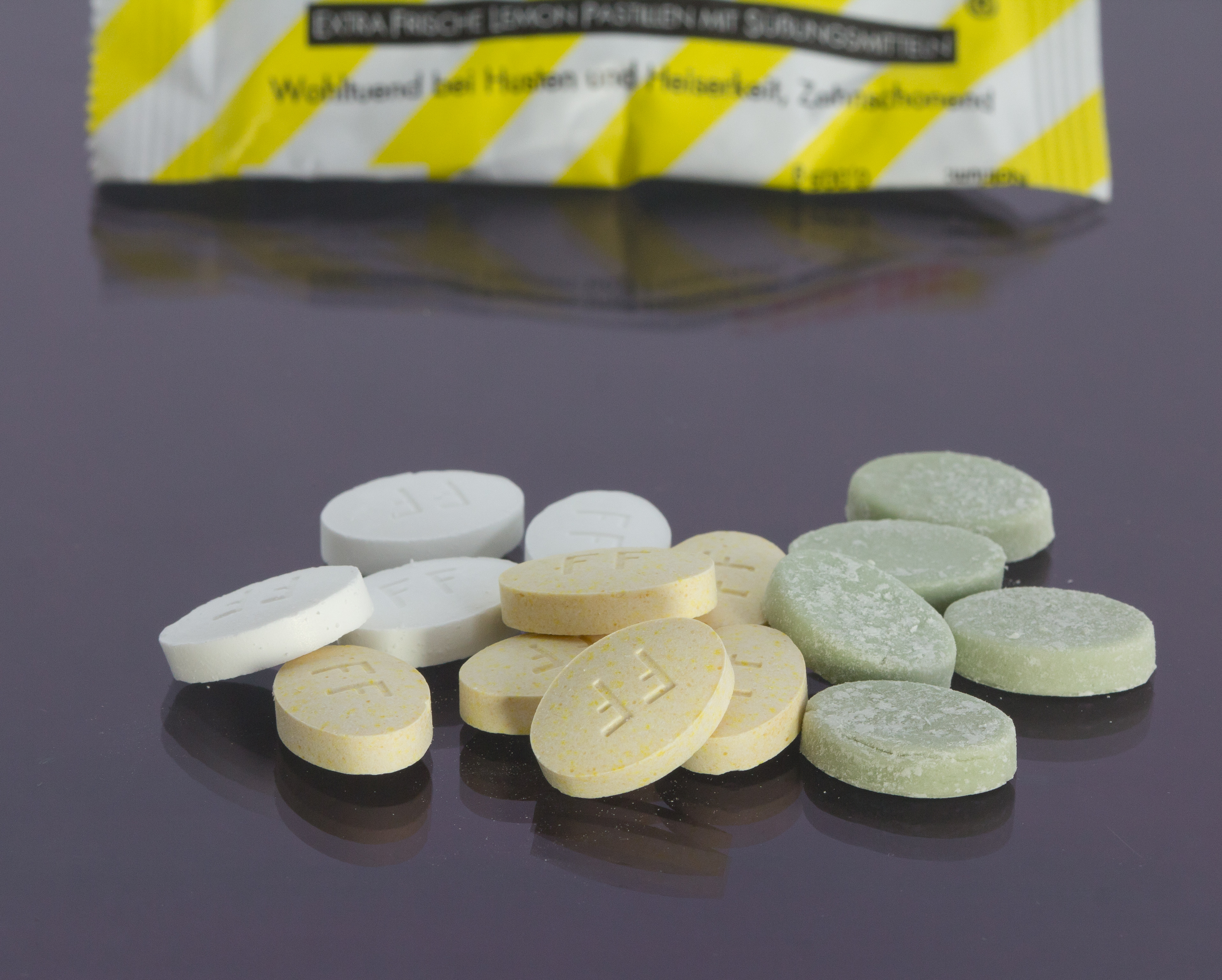
A selection of Fisherman's Friend lozenges

Fisherman's Friend is a brand of strong menthol lozenges manufactured by the Lofthouse company in Fleetwood, Lancashire, England.

In the United Kingdom, the product is classified as a pharmaceutical, but in all other markets it is a confectionary product. The lozenges are relatively unchanged since their creation. The original paper packets later became foil-lined and packaged in a cardboard carton.

Lofthouse of Fleetwood has won the Queen's Award to Industry for Export Achievement on three occasions.

== History ==
Fisherman's Friend was originally developed by pharmacist James Lofthouse in 1865 to relieve various respiratory problems suffered by fishermen working in the extreme conditions of the northern deep-sea fishing areas. He developed it as an extremely strong liquid remedy containing menthol and eucalyptus oil. The product was bottled and then rubbed onto joints for pain or eaten on a sugar cube to treat coughs. Many fishermen quickly took a liking to it and began to refer to it as their "friends", hence the name.

Doreen Lofthouse, who had in the mid-1940s found work in the company and married the son of the founder, Alan Lofthouse, in 1948, recognized the fragility of the glass bottles that the liquid was dispensed in, and developed a lozenge format in the 1950s which was easier to transport and administer. The recipe contained menthol, liquorice extract, and eucalyptus oil, and its shape derived from the buttons of a dress Lofthouse often wore to work.

Initially, Doreen sold the lozenges from a kiosk on Fleetwood's promenade, where they proved popular with holidaying Lancashire mill workers, visiting during Wakes week, who due to their work and life often suffered problems with their chest. She managed to popularize a product that had prior to that been virtually unknown outside of the fishing community, at a time when the fishing sector of the town was already in decline.

In 1963, Doreen Lofthouse became managing director, effectively taking over the company. Under her management, the company expanded enormously. She had received many letters from holidaymakers asking if the pastilles were sold in other towns, and in 1969 she managed to persuade the Lofthouse company to invest in a proper manufacturing site with packaging equipment which was established by 1972. In the same year, she introduced the easily recognizable red and black packaging.. One of the biggest early successes was when Lofthouse persuaded Boots the Chemists to stock the product in all of their branches.

This allowed the company to transition from direct sales to stocking by retailers. Sales of the lozenge subsequently spread abroad, initially to Norway in 1974, where it became quickly popular, leading to interest in other Nordic countries. Different flavours were soon added to appeal to regional tastes.

In 1979, Lofthouse of Fleetwood became the first company to produce a sugar-free mint.

Eventually, Germany and Singapore emerged as the two biggest markets. With 100 million packets sold in 1994, Fisherman's Friend became the UK's biggest food brand export to Germany. In 1997, company turnover reached £25 million, with 40 tonnes (39 long tons; 44 short tons) of pastilles being produced daily that were then exported to 120 countries.

In 2009 the company had 280 employees, being one of Fleetwood's main employers. By 2021, Lofthouse was manufacturing 5 billion lozenges per year, of which 97% were exported, and receiving annual revenues of £55m.

== Famous users ==
To advertise her product, Doreen Lofthouse sent Fisherman's Friend pastilles to any public figure seen coughing, including the then Prince Charles, Ronald Reagan and British prime minister Margaret Thatcher. Thatcher is said to have regularly used the product when her throat became strained from public speaking.

French president Emmanuel Macron has been using them, as well. His affinity has been described as enormous: "He finds his energy in les Fisherman's, those lozenges which rip your throat out. He keeps them in his pockets and in the car-seats. When speaking publicly, he needs water, some slices of lemon and a small dish of Fisherman's. During the Presidential campaign, he was reported to have devoured crates of them, delivered to his campaign headquarters."

== See also ==
- Apteekin Salmiakki
- Bag Balm
- List of breath mints
- Victory V
- Vigroids
