= Glover's Needle =

Steeple in Worcester, Worcestershire, England

Coordinates: 52.1911°N 2.2228°W

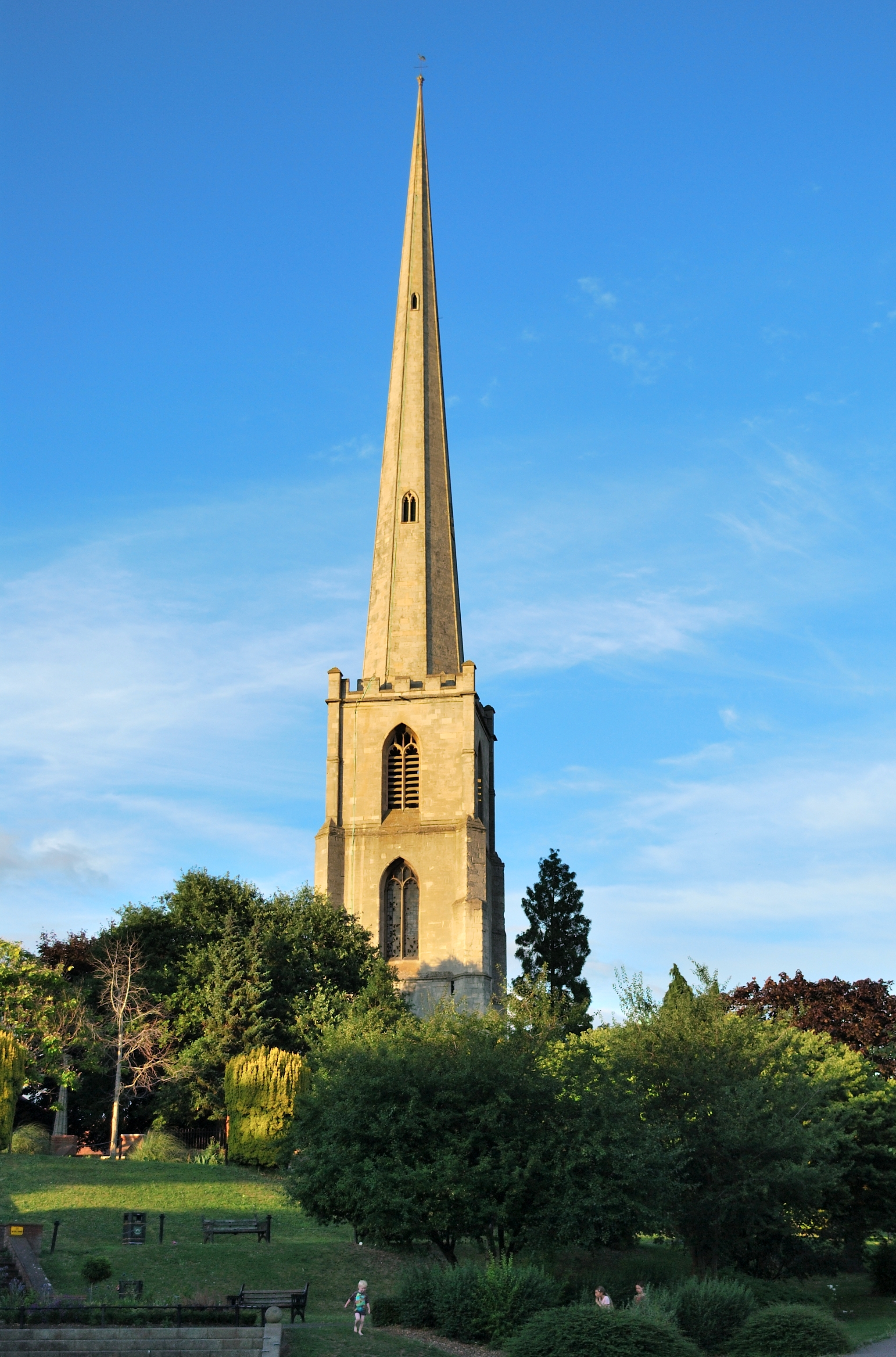
Glover's Needle, Worcester, England

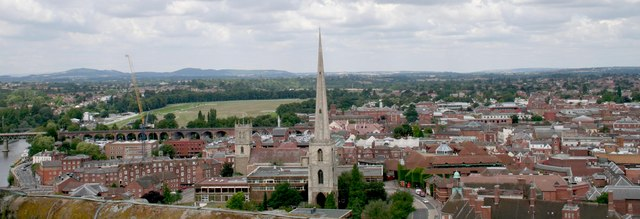
Panoramic view from the tower of Worcester Cathedral

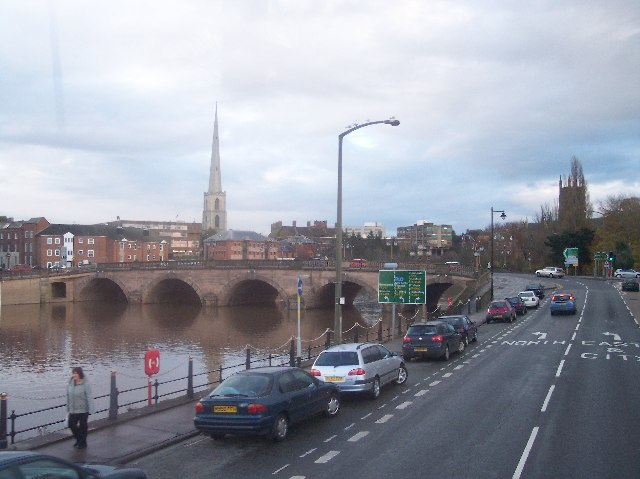
View from the River Severn with Worcester Road Bridge in the foreground

The Glover's Needle (or St Andrews Spire) is a spire-carrying tower in the city of Worcester, England.

== Description ==
The tower is a prominent landmark of the city, from road, rail, or the River Severn, and can be seen for miles around. The highest point on the spire is 74.7 metres (245 feet) tall, making it the tallest building in Worcester. It is located in St Andrews Gardens close to Worcester College of Technology. The spire used to crown the church of St Andrew but this was demolished in the late 1940s. The Glover's Needle is seated on Deansway, Worcester Cathedral being very close to the south and All Saints Church to the north. On the western side of the spire the pedestrian can descend into gardens that lead onto the River Severn. Across the road from the Glover's Needle is a "House of Fraser" shop which stands on the site of the old graveyard of St Andrews. At night the spire is illuminated (but not the tower below) and a blue glow is projected from inside one of the windows. The blue represents St Andrew, the colour of the Scottish flag. The blue glow and night lighting were paid for by the Rotary Club of Worcester Severn, to commemorate the millennium in 2000.

== History ==
St. Andrews, a church with a tall spire, was built in the 15th century, but this was destroyed in a great storm of 1733. The spire was rebuilt in 1751 by Nathaniel Wilkinson. It was constructed by using the ingenious method of kite flying to carry up the stones. Worcester people took the new masterpiece to their hearts and named it the 'Glover's Needle'. This name came from the industrial glove making that was executed in Worcester. The entire structure measures approximately 245 feet. It is the tallest spire in the country to have such a narrow angle of taper. In the 1920s the slum housing which crowded round the church was demolished. The congregation of the church was thus reduced by a large degree. The church fell into decay, had an overgrown churchyard, few parishioners and a tiny parish of five acres. In the 1940s, the council accepted the Bishop of Worcester's offer of the church. They decided to demolish the church and create a garden of remembrance to replace it, but decided to leave the tower and spire, freestanding. The rest of St Andrew's church was demolished in 1949. The original top was replaced by a copy; the original can be found in the public garden which replaced the demolished church.

== Developments near the millennium ==
As a millennium project, a clock was installed in the tower and now the hours are struck on the council bell. A recently reinstated custom is to have the council bell strike from 18:45 to 18:50 before a full meeting of the council. In the early 2000s a fence was put around the base of the spire. A few years ago, the RSPB has taken the Glover's Needle into their own hands and the actual spire is now used for special birds of prey for roosting. Live web cams have been installed in the tower.

== Bells ==
The Glover's Needle formerly housed a set of five bells. These were hung full circle for proper English style change ringing. In 1870, four of the bells were sold but the tenor (heaviest bell) was retained in the old bell frame. This bell weighs 20 CWT — 1 ton. This is the so-called council bell mentioned above. It is unlikely that the Glover's Needle could sustain a ring of bells today as there is no church to buttress the swaying tower.
