= Doreen Lofthouse =

British businesswoman (1930–2021)

Doreen Wilson Lofthouse, OBE (née Cowell; 27 February 1930 – 30 March 2021) was a British businesswoman. Leaving school with no qualifications, she found work at the Lofthouse of Fleetwood chemists. She married into the Lofthouse family and, with her husband Alan, opened a chemist's shop. Lofthouse became interested in one of the products, Fisherman's Friend, a liquid sold to soothe aching joints and ease coughs in seamen. She developed a solid lozenge format which she marketed more widely to the general public.

After becoming managing director of Lofthouse of Fleetwood, Doreen Lofthouse expanded the manufacturing of the lozenges and introduced distinctive red and black packaging. After divorce from Alan, she married his nephew Tony and the couple continued efforts to market the product, achieving their first export deal in 1974. Fisherman's Friend became particularly popular in Germany and Singapore and, by 2021, annual output was 5 billion lozenges and revenue was £55 million. Lofthouse received three Queen's Awards to Industry for her success.

In 1994, Lofthouse and her husband established a charitable foundation that donated tens of millions of pounds to a variety of causes in the Fleetwood area. For her work with the company and for charity, she was appointed an officer of the Order of the British Empire and was granted the freedom of the borough.

== Early life ==
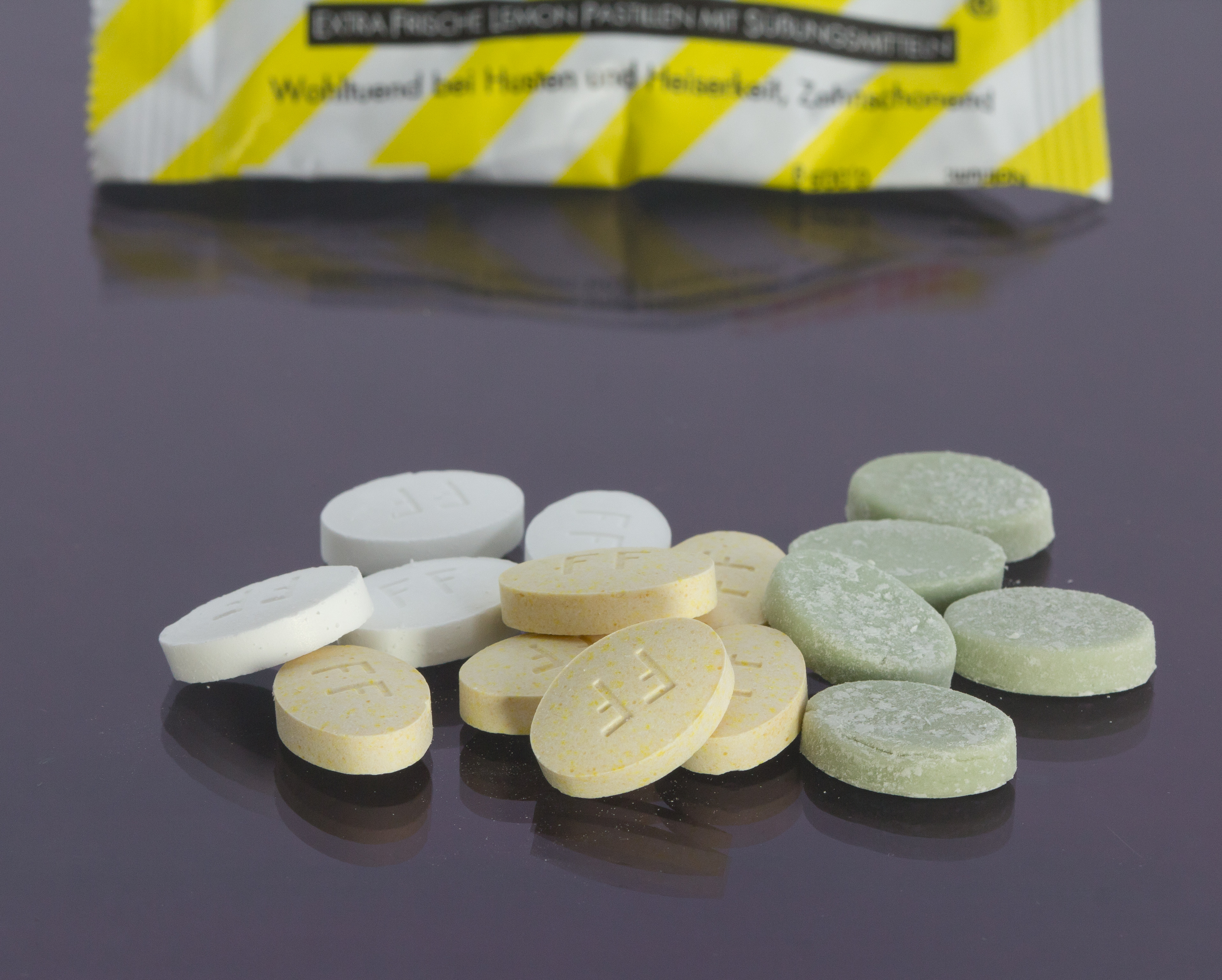
Fisherman's Friend lozenges

Doreen Wilson Cowell was born on 27 February 1930 in Fleetwood, Lancashire. She grew up in Over Wyre but later returned to Fleetwood. Cowell was described as a loud and determined child. She left school at the age of 15 in 1945 with no qualifications.

Cowell found work in the Lofthouse chemists in Fleetwood. The chemists, now known as Lofthouse of Fleetwood, had, in 1865, been run by James Lofthouse. He developed the Fisherman's Friend to treat the ailments of those working in the town's fishing fleet in the North Atlantic. The product was rubbed onto joints for pain or eaten on a sugar cube to treat coughs.

In 1948, Cowell married James's son, Alan, taking his surname. Alan was severely deaf and shy by nature. The couple opened their own chemist shop in Fleetwood and lived above it. Recognising the fragility of the glass bottles that Fisherman's Friend was dispensed in, she developed a lozenge format in the 1950s. The lozenge contained menthol, liquorice extract, and eucalyptus oil, and its shape derived from the buttons of a dress Lofthouse often wore to work. Doreen sold the lozenges from a kiosk on Fleetwood promenade and they proved popular with holidaying Lancashire mill workers, visiting during Wakes week, whose work and living conditions gave rise to chest complaints. Before this time, the product was virtually unknown outside of the fishing community.

== Running Lofthouse of Fleetwood ==
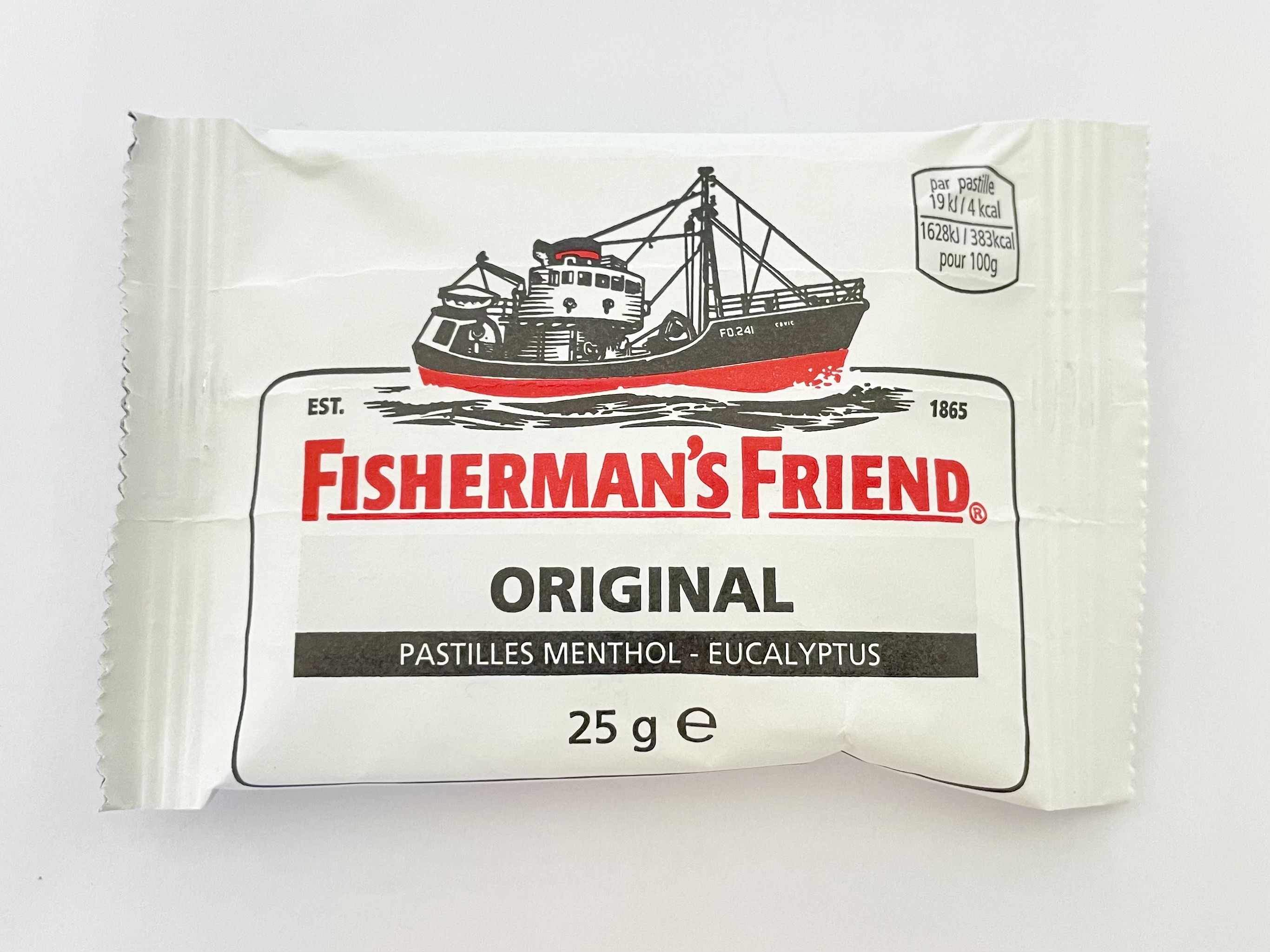
The red and black packaging, seen on a pack exported to France

In 1963, Doreen Lofthouse became managing director of Lofthouse of Fleetwood. She was alerted to the growing popularity of the Fisherman's Friend lozenges by letters from holidaymakers asking if the product was sold outside of Fleetwood. Lofthouse collated these letters and used them to persuade retailers of the popularity of her product; once a stockist had been found, Lofthouse wrote back to her enquirer to advise them of this. The expansion beyond the traditional market was key to the product's survival, as the fishing industry in the town was in decline. By 1969, she had managed to persuade the Lofthouse family that the lozenges were a key growth market and to invest in a manufacturing site and packaging equipment. The business first expanded into a former tram shed but, in 1972, established in a 20,000 square feet (1,900 m^{2}) industrial unit. In the same year, Lofthouse introduced distinctive black and red packaging.

Lofthouse's marriage to Alan ended in divorce and, in 1976, she married Tony Lofthouse, son of her ex-husband's brother; Tony was 14 years younger than Doreen. The marriage caused some upset in the family but they continued their business relationship. Doreen and Tony had spent many years working 100-hour weeks, travelling by van to sell the product. She recalled that sometimes, lacking money for fuel, she was unable to leave a town until a sale had been made. A particular success came when Lofthouse persuaded Boots the Chemists to stock the product in all of their branches. As a marketing ploy, she sent Fisherman's Friends to any public figure seen to cough, including Margaret Thatcher, Ronald Reagan and Charles, Prince of Wales.

A 1973 enquiry by Impex Management led to the first foreign exports of the product, to Norway, in 1974. The product proved popular there, due to the cold climate, and was swiftly followed by interest from other Nordic countries. In the United Kingdom, the product is classified as a pharmaceutical but in all other markets it is a confectionary product. In the UK, the clientele tends to be older and the product is taken chiefly as a remedy for the common cold, while abroad it is eaten as a sweet by a younger customer base. The two most popular markets are Germany and Singapore.

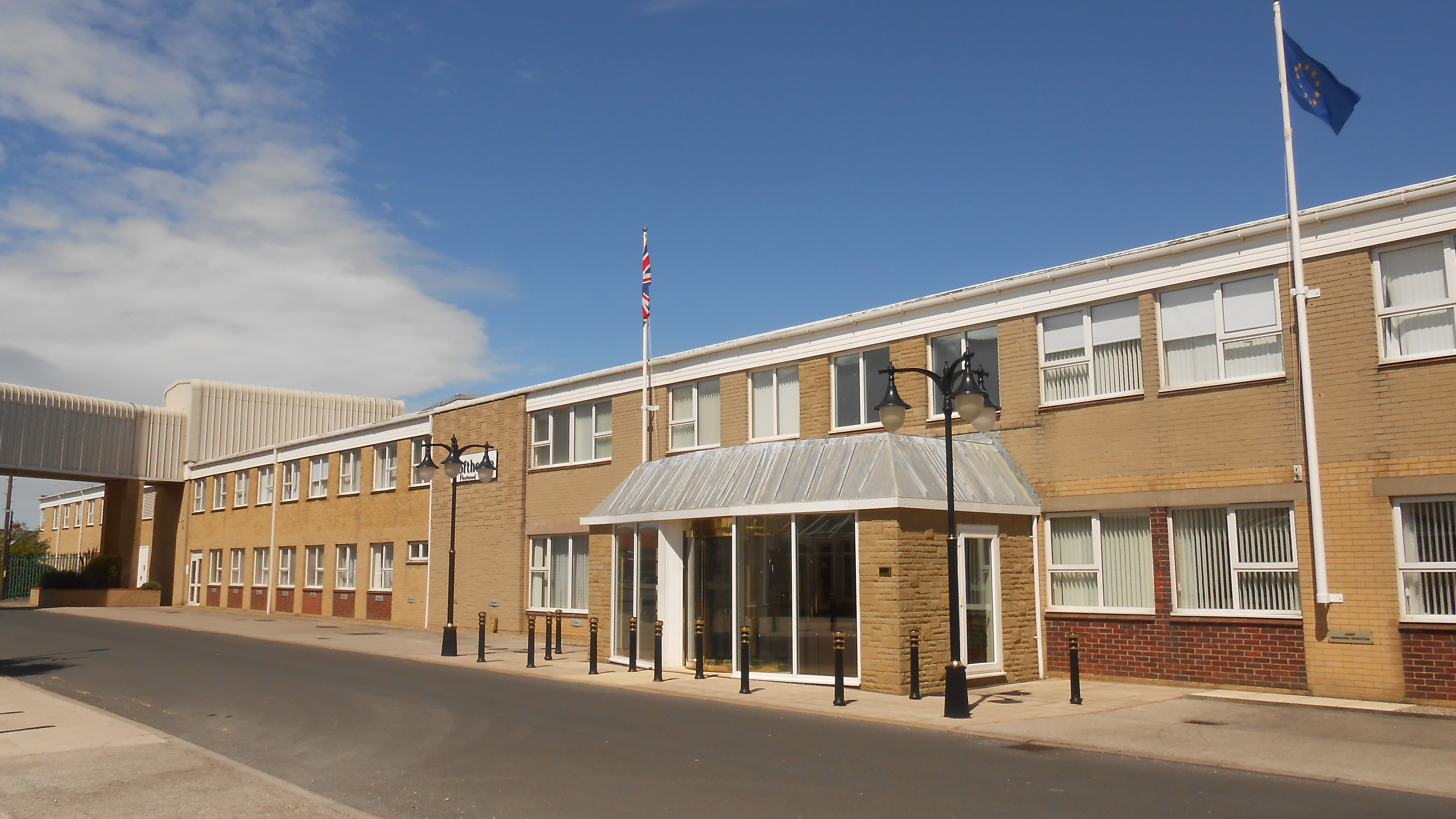
The Fisherman's Friend headquarters

In 1979, Lofthouse of Fleetwood became the first company to produce a sugar-free mint. Doreen Lofthouse was awarded a Queen's Award to Industry for export achievement in 1983; she would go on to receive two further Queen's Awards. With 100 million packets sold in 1994, Fisherman's Friend became the UK's biggest food brand export to Germany. By 1997, company turnover reached £25 million and 40 tonnes (39 long tons; 44 short tons) of the product were made daily and exported to 120 countries. The company became one of Fleetwood's main employers by 2009, when they had 280 staff. By 2021, Lofthouse was manufacturing 5 billion lozenges per year, of which 97% were exported, and receiving annual revenues of £55m.

== Personal life and legacy ==
Lofthouse lived with Tony in Thornton, Lancashire. Because of the success of Lofthouse of Fleetwood she became one of the richest women in Britain. In 1994, she established, with Tony, the Lofthouse Foundation to put a portion of company profits to charitable causes; it went on to donate tens of millions of pounds to local charities. This included paying for children's playgrounds, medical equipment, public realm works, and the refurbishment of Fleetwood Hospital. The foundation also funded the Fleetwood's 150th birthday celebrations and converted a derelict engineering yard into a youth centre. Other projects include the £1 million restoration of Mount Garden, floodlights for Fleetwood Town F.C., an RNLI lifeboat, artwork, and statues, including a replica of the Piccadilly Circus Eros statue erected in 2006.

For her charitable work, Lofthouse became known as "the mother of Fleetwood" and was granted the freedom of the Borough of Wyre. In the 1987 Birthday Honours, she was appointed a member of the Order of the British Empire for services to export. In the 2008 New Year Honours, she was appointed an officer of the same order for services to business and the community in Lancashire.

Lofthouse's home was burgled in March 2009, during which Tony was injured and the couple were confined to a bathroom overnight. They lost £500,000 of possessions including her MBE and OBE medals and a gold replica of a Fisherman's Friend that Tony had given to Lofthouse as a wedding present. Lofthouse donated the six-figure insurance payout to Lancashire Police, who used it to pay for a network of ANPR cameras. Tony died in 2018, at the age of 74. Doreen Lofthouse died at Blackpool Victoria Hospital on 30 March 2021, aged 91.

Doreen's son with Alan Lofthouse, Duncan, went on to run the family business. In her will, she left £325,000 for her domestic staff and £41 million in Lofthouse of Fleetwood shares to the Lofthouse Foundation. On 24 January 2022, Wyre Council unveiled a commemorative board in Doreen Lofthouse's honour at Mount Garden.
