= Worcester Boer War Memorial =

War memorial in Worcester, England

Coordinates: 52°11′21″N 2°13′14″W

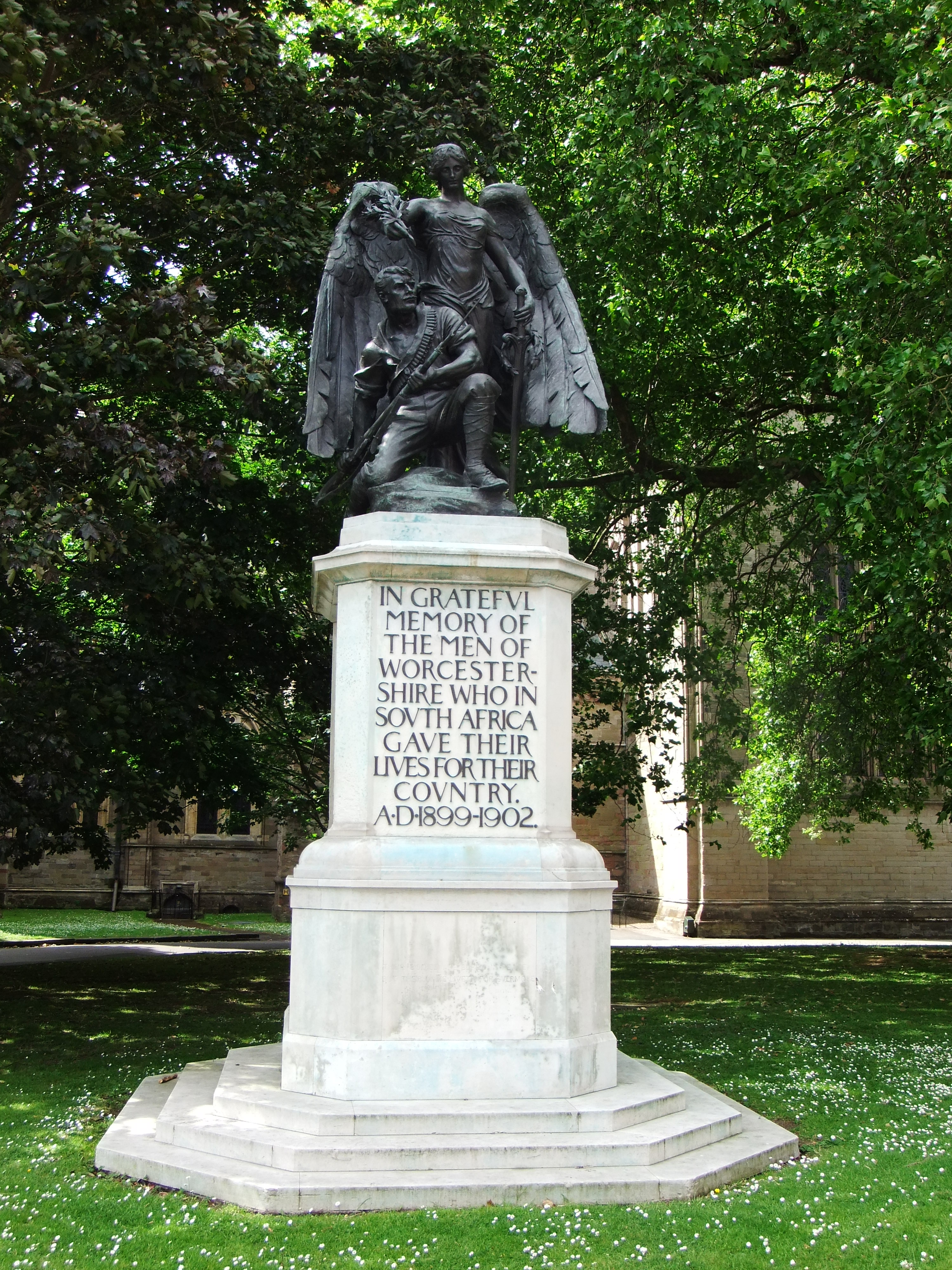
Worcester Boer War Memorial in 2011

The Worcester Boer War Memorial in Worcester, England, was unveiled near Worcester Cathedral in 1908. The war memorial commemorates casualties of the Second Boer War from the county of Worcestershire. It was designated a Grade II* listed building in 1999.

The memorial comprises a bronze sculptural group mounted on an octagonal Portland stone plinth and base, standing on three steps. The front of the plinth bears the inscription: 'IN GRATEFUL / MEMORY OF / THE MEN OF / WORCESTER-/ SHIRE WHO IN / SOUTH AFRICA / GAVE THEIR / LIVES FOR THEIR / COUNTRY. / A.D.1899-1902." A further inscription on the stone base quotes from Ecclesiasticus: "Their bodies are buried in peace; / but their name liveth for evermore. Ecclus XLIV 14"

The bronze sculpture by William Robert Colton depicts a soldier of the Worcestershire Regiment, bare-headed and bare-armed, with a bandolier of bullets, kneeling with a bayonet affixed to his rifle held in a high "ready" position, in front of a standing winged female figure (interpreted in various sources as an angel, or a Winged Victory, or a personification of "Immortality") with her left hand gripping a sheathed sword girt with a laurel wreath and the right holding an olive branch (or possibly a palm branch) over the head of the soldier.

The memorial was unveiled on 23 September 1908 by General Sir Neville Lyttelton, on a site to the north of Worcester Cathedral. It stands close to the passing A44.

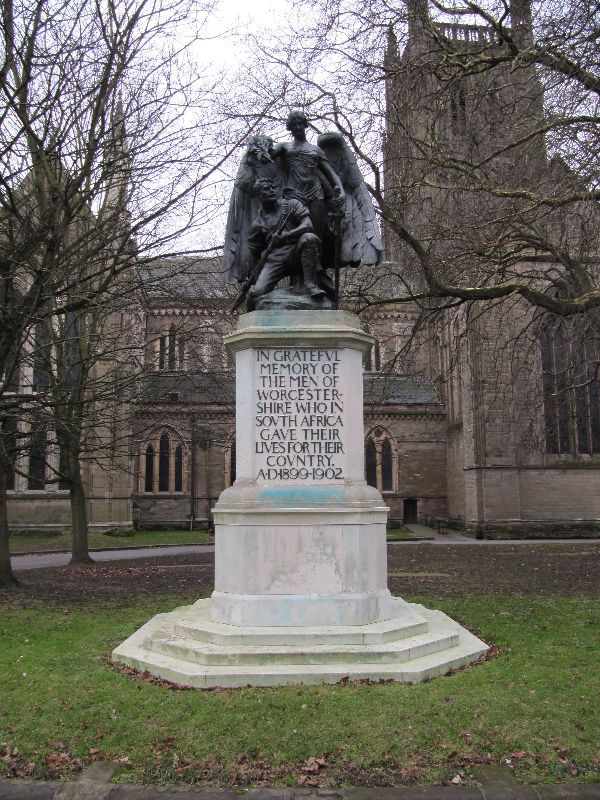
The memorial stands on the north side of Worcester Cathedral

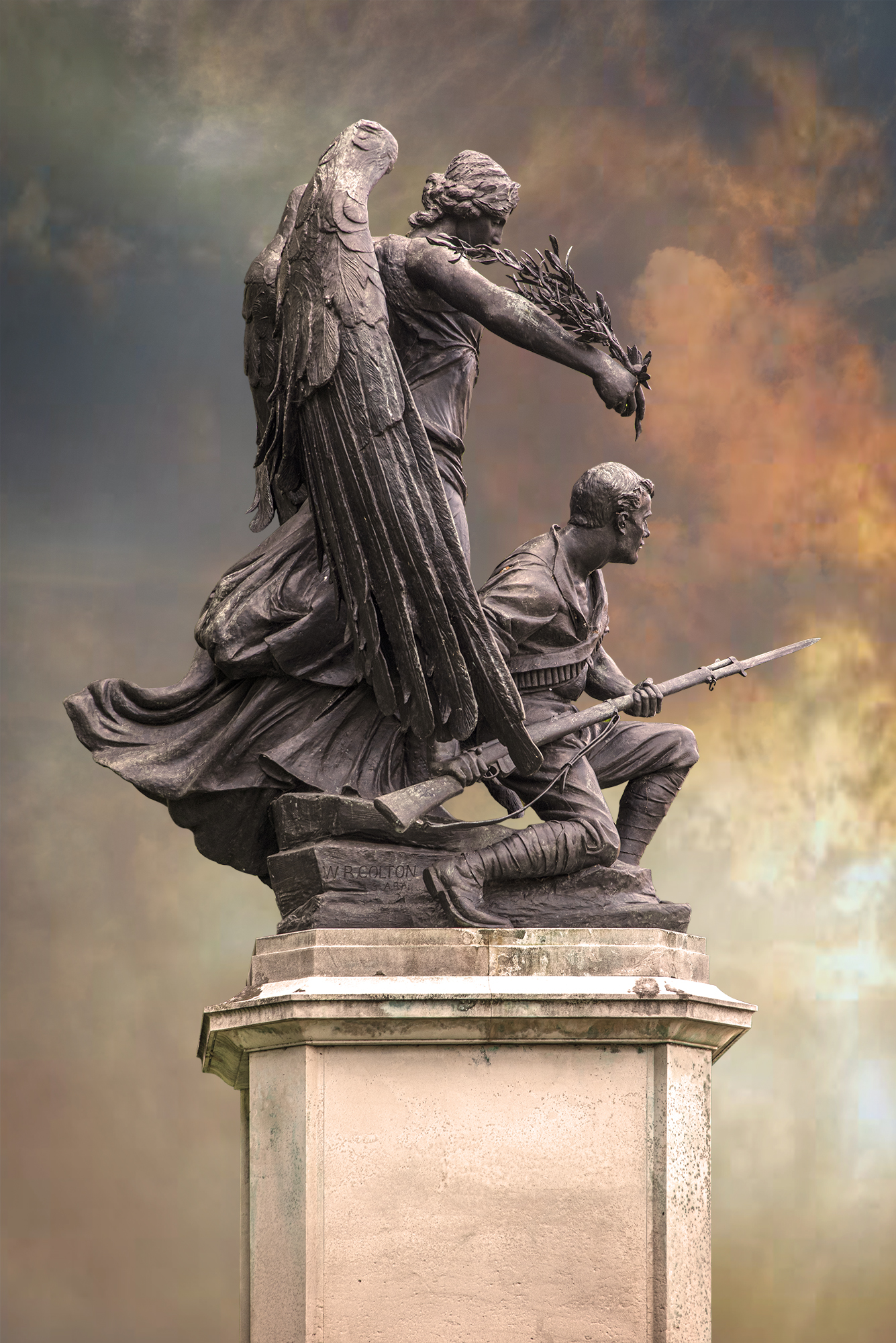
Side view

== See also ==
- Royal Artillery Boer War Memorial
