= Lofthouse of Fleetwood =

British company which makes Fisherman's Friend menthol lozenges

Lofthouse of Fleetwood Ltd.
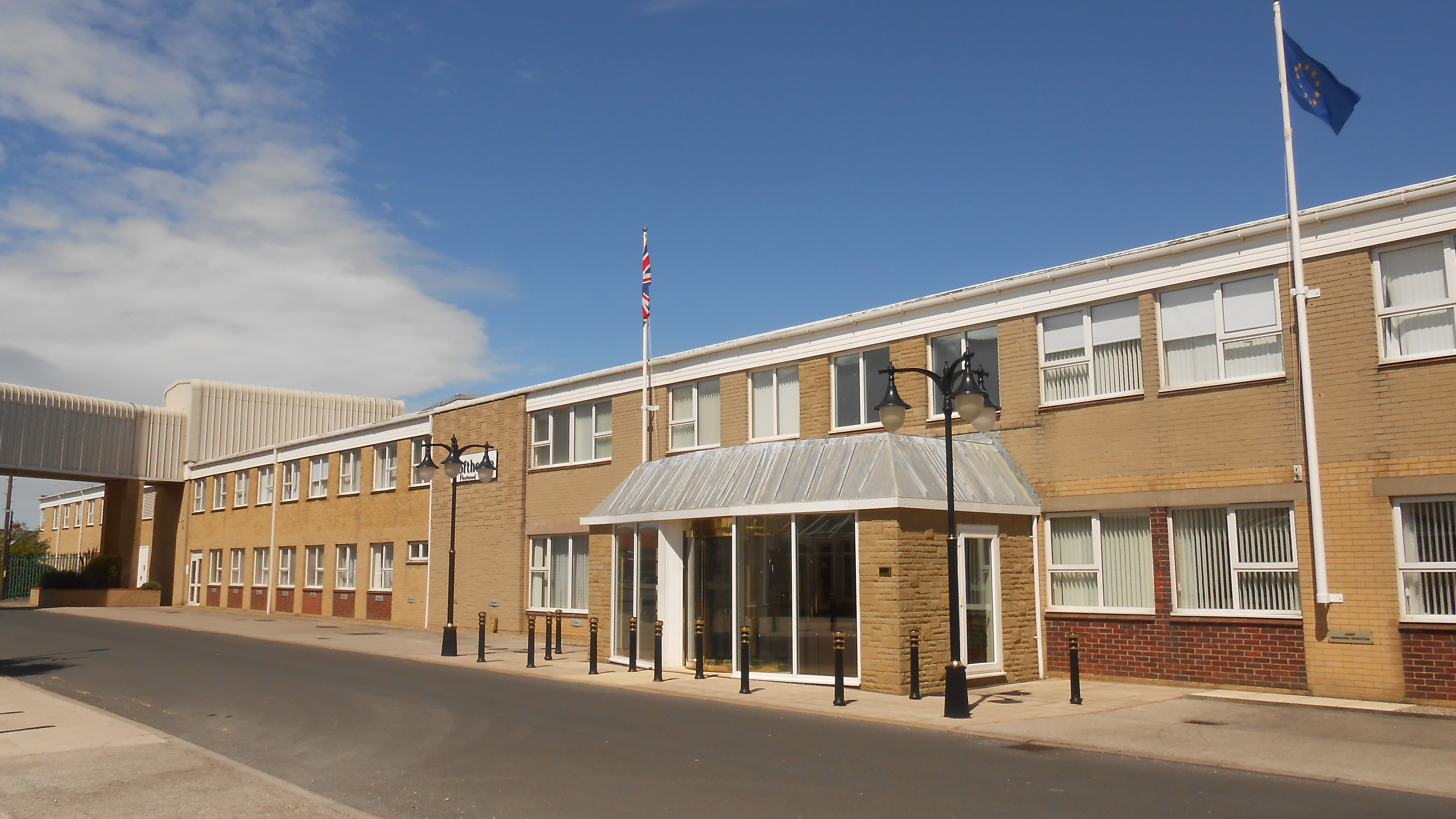
- Headquarters of Lofthouse Ltd. in Fleetwood
- Type: Private
- Industry: Food industry
- Founded: 1865; 161 years ago in Fleetwood, Lancashire, United Kingdom
- Founder: James Lofthouse
- Headquarters: Fleetwood, United Kingdom
- Area served: Worldwide
- Products: Fisherman's Friend
- Owners: Duncan Lofthouse & a family foundation
- Number of employees: 320
- Website: www.fishermansfriend.com

Lofthouse of Fleetwood Ltd. is a British family-owned company based in Fleetwood on the Lancashire coast. It was founded by James Lofthouse in 1865. It was headed by Tony Lofthouse until his death in 2018; he was the fourth generation of the Lofthouse family to head the company. The company's most famous product is the Fisherman's Friend menthol lozenge.

The company's shares are held by a family foundation and Duncan Lofthouse. Doreen Lofthouse who led the company from 1963 died in 2021, at the age of 91.
