= Listed buildings in Worcester (centre) =

Buildings in Worcester, England

Worcester is a cathedral city and non-civil parish in Worcestershire, England. It contains 697 listed buildings that are recorded in the National Heritage List for England. Of these 13 are grade I, 40 are grade II* and 644 are grade II.

This list is based on the information retrieved online from Historic England. The quantity of listed buildings in Worcester requires subdivision into geographically defined lists. This list includes all listed buildings located in city centre.

== Key ==
Grade	Criteria
I	Buildings that are of exceptional interest
II*	Particularly important buildings of more than special interest
II	Buildings that are of special interest

== Listing ==
Name	Grade	Location	Type	Completed (Note: The date given is the date used by Historic England as significant for the initial building or that of an important part in the structure's description.)	Date designated	Grid ref. (Note: The grid reference is based on the British national grid reference system, sometimes known as OSGB36, used by the Ordnance Survey.) Geo-coordinates	Notes	Entry number (Note: The "List Entry Number" is a unique number assigned to each listed building and scheduled monument by Historic England.)	Image	Wikidata
Angel Centre	II	Angel Place			11 February 1987	SO8482555101; 52°11′38″N 2°13′24″W		1359633	Angel Centre More images	Q26641855
Premises Occupied by Tramps Night Club	II	Angel Place			5 April 1971	SO8482755082; 52°11′38″N 2°13′24″W		1359634	Premises Occupied by Tramps Night Club More images	Q26641856
23A, B And C, Angel Place	II	23A, B and C, Angel Place			5 April 1971	SO8484255069; 52°11′37″N 2°13′23″W		1359632	Upload Photo	Q26641854
Former Corn Exchange and Attached Railings	II	Angel Street			5 April 1971	SO8489955041; 52°11′36″N 2°13′20″W		1359548	Former Corn Exchange and Attached Railings More images	Q26641774
Warehouse Immediately at Rear of Corn Exchange	II	Angel Street			4 June 1975	SO8490655024; 52°11′36″N 2°13′20″W		1359549	Upload Photo	Q26641775
1, 1a and 3, Angel Street	II	1, 1a and 3, Angel Street			8 March 1974	SO8494055066; 52°11′37″N 2°13′18″W		1359635	Upload Photo	Q26641857
6, Angel Street	II	6, Angel Street, WR1 3QT			22 May 1954	SO8492255082; 52°11′38″N 2°13′19″W		1359636	6, Angel Street More images	Q26641858
The Horn and Trumpet Public House	II	12, Angel Street			8 March 1974	SO8488955068; 52°11′37″N 2°13′21″W		1359579	The Horn and Trumpet Public House More images	Q26641805
13, Angel Street	II	13, Angel Street			19 August 1999	SO8491355046; 52°11′36″N 2°13′20″W		1389861	Upload Photo	Q26669282
65A, 65B And 65C, High Street, 1 and 1a, Bank Street	II	1 and 1a, Bank Street			22 May 1954	SO8497054947; 52°11′33″N 2°13′17″W		1389902	Upload Photo	Q26669326
John Gwynn House	II	Bridge Street			5 April 1971	SO8469054858; 52°11′30″N 2°13′31″W		1063922	John Gwynn House More images	Q26317190
K6 Telephone Kiosk	II	Bridge Street			16 June 1988	SO8476254884; 52°11′31″N 2°13′28″W		1359627	K6 Telephone Kiosk	Q26641850
Worcester Bridge	II	Bridge Street			22 May 1954	SO8464354781; 52°11′28″N 2°13′34″W		1063923	Worcester Bridge More images	Q26317191
5-13, Bridge Street And 2, Quay Street	II	5-13, Bridge Street			5 April 1971	SO8472354859; 52°11′30″N 2°13′30″W		1063921	Upload Photo	Q26317189
Crown Inn	II	10, 10a and 11, Broad Street			22 May 1954	SO8490654996; 52°11′35″N 2°13′20″W		1063863	Crown Inn More images	Q26317134
12, Broad Street	II	12, Broad Street			5 April 1971	SO8488954979; 52°11′34″N 2°13′21″W		1063864	Upload Photo	Q26317135
The Boston Tea Party	II	18, Broad Street, WR1 3NF			5 April 1971	SO8484654972; 52°11′34″N 2°13′23″W		1359631	The Boston Tea Party More images	Q26641853
19, Broad Street	II	19, Broad Street			5 April 1971	SO8484054965; 52°11′34″N 2°13′23″W		1063865	Upload Photo	Q26317136
29, Broad Street	II	29, Broad Street			22 May 1954	SO8476754935; 52°11′33″N 2°13′27″W		1063866	Upload Photo	Q26317137
32, Broad Street	II	32, Broad Street			8 March 1974	SO8475454920; 52°11′32″N 2°13′28″W		1063867	Upload Photo	Q26317138
33 and 34, Broad Street	II	33 and 34, Broad Street			8 March 1974	SO8474854914; 52°11′32″N 2°13′28″W		1063868	Upload Photo	Q26317139
35 and 36, Broad Street	II	35 and 36, Broad Street			5 April 1971	SO8474254906; 52°11′32″N 2°13′29″W		1063869	Upload Photo	Q26317140
40 and 41, Broad Street	II	40 and 41, Broad Street			8 March 1974	SO8478954923; 52°11′32″N 2°13′26″W		1063870	Upload Photo	Q26317141
43 and 44, Broad Street	II	43 and 44, Broad Street			8 March 1974	SO8480754930; 52°11′33″N 2°13′25″W		1063871	Upload Photo	Q26317142
45, Broad Street	II	45, Broad Street			5 April 1971	SO8481554932; 52°11′33″N 2°13′25″W		1063872	Upload Photo	Q26317143
46 and 47, Broad Street	II	46 and 47, Broad Street			22 May 1954	SO8482154936; 52°11′33″N 2°13′24″W		1063873	Upload Photo	Q26317144
48, Broad Street	II	48, Broad Street			22 May 1954	SO8482954939; 52°11′33″N 2°13′24″W		1063874	Upload Photo	Q26317145
49, Broad Street	II	49, Broad Street			5 April 1971	SO8483654941; 52°11′33″N 2°13′24″W		1063875	Upload Photo	Q26317146
51, Broad Street	II	51, Broad Street			22 May 1954	SO8484754945; 52°11′33″N 2°13′23″W		1063876	Upload Photo	Q26317147
52, Broad Street	II	52, Broad Street			22 May 1954	SO8485554947; 52°11′33″N 2°13′23″W		1063877	Upload Photo	Q26317148
53, Broad Street	II	53, Broad Street			22 May 1954	SO8486154949; 52°11′33″N 2°13′22″W		1063878	Upload Photo	Q26317150
54, Broad Street	II	54, Broad Street			5 April 1971	SO8486754950; 52°11′33″N 2°13′22″W		1063879	Upload Photo	Q26317151
57 and 57a, Broad Street	II	57 and 57a, Broad Street			5 April 1971	SO8489454955; 52°11′33″N 2°13′21″W		1063882	Upload Photo	Q26317154
58, Broad Street	II	58, Broad Street			5 April 1971	SO8490054959; 52°11′34″N 2°13′20″W		1063884	Upload Photo	Q26317156
59 and 60, Broad Street	II	59 and 60, Broad Street			22 May 1954	SO8490754961; 52°11′34″N 2°13′20″W		1063885	59 and 60, Broad Street	Q26317157
61, Broad Street	II*	61, Broad Street			22 May 1954	SO8491554962; 52°11′34″N 2°13′20″W		1063886	61, Broad Street More images	Q17548082
62 and 63, Broad Street	II	62 and 63, Broad Street			8 March 1974	SO8492054963; 52°11′34″N 2°13′19″W		1063887	62 and 63, Broad Street	Q26317158
69, Broad Street	II	69, Broad Street			16 July 1999	SO8495754972; 52°11′34″N 2°13′17″W		1063888	Upload Photo	Q26317159
70, Broad Street	II	70, Broad Street			8 March 1974	SO8496354972; 52°11′34″N 2°13′17″W		1063889	Upload Photo	Q26317160
5 and 6, Castle Place	II	5 and 6, Castle Place			2 November 1999	SO8507554383; 52°11′15″N 2°13′11″W		1063797	Upload Photo	Q26317075
Former H A Saunders Garage, Worcester	II	Castle Street			12 January 2012	SO8465355352; 52°11′46″N 2°13′33″W		1405551	Upload Photo	Q26675745
6 and 10, Castle Street	II	6 and 10, Castle Street			8 March 1974	SO8474155408; 52°11′48″N 2°13′29″W		1063798	Upload Photo	Q26317076
Worcester Royal Infirmary Main Building And Chapel, Former Outpatients, Department And King Edward VII Memorial Annexe	II	Castle Street			14 December 1988	SO8465255289; 52°11′44″N 2°13′33″W		1063799	Upload Photo	Q26317077
Huntingdon Hall	II*	Chapel Walk, WR1 3LD			22 May 1954	SO8491354856; 52°11′30″N 2°13′20″W		1063893	Huntingdon Hall More images	Q17548093
17 and 18, Chapel Walk	II	17 and 18, Chapel Walk, WR1 3LD			5 April 1971	SO8488554956; 52°11′33″N 2°13′21″W		1063881	Upload Photo	Q26317153
Church of St Swithun and Attached Railings	I	Church Street			22 May 1954	SO8504354949; 52°11′33″N 2°13′13″W		1063801	Church of St Swithun and Attached Railings More images	Q7595504
Giulio's Restaurant	II	Church Street			22 May 1954	SO8503154958; 52°11′34″N 2°13′13″W		1063802	Upload Photo	Q26317079
K6 Telephone Kiosk Approximately 6 Metres West of Church of St Swithun	II	Church Street			2 November 1999	SO8502354941; 52°11′33″N 2°13′14″W		1063803	Upload Photo	Q26317080
City Wall, Extending N From Junction Of Nash's Passage With City Walls Road	II	City Walls Road			5 April 1971	SO8521754841; 52°11′30″N 2°13′04″W		1063804	Upload Photo	Q17641841
City Wall, Extending N From Junction Of Windsor Row With City Walls Road	II	City Walls Road			5 April 1971	SO8521154932; 52°11′33″N 2°13′04″W		1063805	Upload Photo	Q26317082
City Wall, Extending S From E Boundary Of No.37 Friar Street	II	City Walls Road			5 April 1971	SO8521454573; 52°11′21″N 2°13′04″W		1063806	Upload Photo	Q26317083
City Wall, Extending S From Junction Of Charles Street With City Walls Road	II	City Walls Road			5 April 1971	SO8519854696; 52°11′25″N 2°13′05″W		1063807	Upload Photo	Q26317084
City Wall, Extending S From Junction Of Nash's Passage With City Walls Road	II	City Walls Road			5 April 1971	SO8520654789; 52°11′28″N 2°13′04″W		1063808	Upload Photo	Q26317085
Castle House	II	6, Colege Green			5 April 1971	SO8499754393; 52°11′15″N 2°13′15″W		1063820	Upload Photo	Q26317096
Boundary Walls To West And South Of Nos 13 And 14 Including Railings Monastic Precinct Wall Abutting No 12A	II	College Green			5 April 1971	SO8492754437; 52°11′17″N 2°13′19″W		1063828	Upload Photo	Q26317100
Cathedral Church of Christ and St Mary	I	College Green			22 May 1954	SO8500254520; 52°11′19″N 2°13′15″W		1389728	Cathedral Church of Christ and St Mary More images	Q1630367
Edgar Tower	I	College Green			22 May 1954	SO8507554445; 52°11′17″N 2°13′11″W		1063829	Edgar Tower More images	Q17641950
King's School Hall	I	College Green			22 May 1954	SO8497854463; 52°11′18″N 2°13′16″W		1063830	King's School Hall More images	Q17530367
Remains of Ancient Sandstone Wall Abutting No 6 on West	II	College Green			5 April 1971	SO8498854387; 52°11′15″N 2°13′16″W		1063831	Upload Photo	Q26317101
Sundial at Rear of No 8 (no 8 Not Included)	II	College Green			2 November 1999	SO8498154367; 52°11′14″N 2°13′16″W		1063833	Upload Photo	Q26317103
2, College Green	II	2, College Green			22 May 1954	SO8505454438; 52°11′17″N 2°13′12″W		1063816	Upload Photo	Q26317092
Choir House	II	3, College Green			5 April 1971	SO8506054419; 52°11′16″N 2°13′12″W		1063817	Upload Photo	Q26317093
Choir House and the Old Library	II	4 and 4a, College Green			5 April 1971	SO8504354399; 52°11′15″N 2°13′13″W		1063818	Upload Photo	Q26317094
Hostel House	II	5, College Green			22 May 1954	SO8501154392; 52°11′15″N 2°13′14″W		1063819	Upload Photo	Q26317095
No 9 and Attached Wall to Left at Rear	II*	9, College Green			22 May 1954	SO8495254353; 52°11′14″N 2°13′17″W		1063821	Upload Photo	Q17548062
The Deanery (no 10) and Office (10a) with Attached Walls	II*	10 and 10a, College Green			22 May 1954	SO8493754374; 52°11′15″N 2°13′18″W		1063822	Upload Photo	Q17548067
12 and 12a, College Green	II	12 and 12a, College Green			22 May 1954	SO8492854411; 52°11′16″N 2°13′19″W		1063823	12 and 12a, College Green More images	Q26317097
Water Gate House and Attached Walls and Gate to East	II*	12b, College Green			22 May 1954	SO8490754425; 52°11′16″N 2°13′20″W		1063824	Water Gate House and Attached Walls and Gate to East More images	Q17548070
13, College Green	II	13, College Green			19 August 1999	SO8494654456; 52°11′17″N 2°13′18″W		1063825	13, College Green More images	Q26317098
14 and 14a, College Green	II	14 and 14a, College Green			19 August 1999	SO8495154474; 52°11′18″N 2°13′18″W		1063826	Upload Photo	Q26317099
No 15 and Wall Adjoining to East	II*	15, College Green			22 May 1954	SO8505954457; 52°11′17″N 2°13′12″W		1063827	No 15 and Wall Adjoining to East More images	Q17548076
1 and 2, College Precincts	II	1 and 2, College Precincts			5 April 1971	SO8508954532; 52°11′20″N 2°13′10″W		1063834	Upload Photo	Q26317104
3, College Precincts	II	3, College Precincts			8 March 1974	SO8509454519; 52°11′19″N 2°13′10″W		1063835	Upload Photo	Q26317105
Burgage House	II	4, College Precincts			5 April 1971	SO8509054508; 52°11′19″N 2°13′10″W		1063836	Upload Photo	Q26317107
5 and 6, College Precincts	II	5 and 6, College Precincts			22 May 1954	SO8509354497; 52°11′19″N 2°13′10″W		1063837	Upload Photo	Q26317108
7, College Precincts	II	7, College Precincts			22 May 1954	SO8509654489; 52°11′18″N 2°13′10″W		1063838	Upload Photo	Q26317109
8, College Precincts	II	8, College Precincts			22 May 1954	SO8509554482; 52°11′18″N 2°13′10″W		1063839	Upload Photo	Q26317110
9, College Precincts	II	9, College Precincts			22 May 1954	SO8509554474; 52°11′18″N 2°13′10″W		1063840	Upload Photo	Q26317111
10, College Precincts	II	10, College Precincts			22 May 1954	SO8509354465; 52°11′18″N 2°13′10″W		1389722	Upload Photo	Q26669155
12, College Precincts	II	12, College Precincts			22 May 1954	SO8509454457; 52°11′17″N 2°13′10″W		1389723	Upload Photo	Q26669156
Cathedral Of St Mary: Cloister Range, Chapter House And Undercroft With Refectory	I	College Street			22 May 1954	SO8499754484; 52°11′18″N 2°13′15″W		1389729	Cathedral Of St Mary: Cloister Range, Chapter House And Undercroft With Refectory More images	Q94998725
First World War Memorial	II	College Street			19 August 1999	SO8504954563; 52°11′21″N 2°13′12″W		1389730	First World War Memorial More images	Q26669161
South African War Memorial	II*	College Street			19 August 1999	SO8502554577; 52°11′21″N 2°13′14″W		1389731	South African War Memorial More images	Q17548109
26, College Street	II	26, College Street			5 April 1971	SO8511354514; 52°11′19″N 2°13′09″W		1389724	Upload Photo	Q26669157
Columbus House	II	27, College Street			5 April 1971	SO8510754519; 52°11′19″N 2°13′09″W		1389725	Upload Photo	Q26669158
28 and 29, College Street	II	28 and 29, College Street			5 April 1971	SO8510154528; 52°11′20″N 2°13′10″W		1389726	Upload Photo	Q26669159
30, College Street	II	30, College Street			5 April 1971	SO8509154540; 52°11′20″N 2°13′10″W		1389727	Upload Photo	Q26669160
32, College Street	II	32, College Street, WR1 2JD			22 May 1954	SO8501554599; 52°11′22″N 2°13′14″W		1389732	32, College Street More images	Q26669162
2 and 3, College Yard	II	2 and 3, College Yard			22 May 1954	SO8500454598; 52°11′22″N 2°13′15″W		1389733	2 and 3, College Yard	Q26669163
St Andrew's Church Tower	II*	Copenhagen Street			22 May 1954	SO8486454783; 52°11′28″N 2°13′22″W		1389762	St Andrew's Church Tower More images	Q5572146
7, Copenhagen Street	II	7, Copenhagen Street			5 April 1971	SO8499654748; 52°11′27″N 2°13′15″W		1389748	Upload Photo	Q26669178
9 and 11, Copenhagen Street	II	9 and 11, Copenhagen Street			5 April 1971	SO8498454751; 52°11′27″N 2°13′16″W		1389749	Upload Photo	Q26669179
4, College Yard	II	4, College Yard			22 May 1954	SO8499354599; 52°11′22″N 2°13′15″W		1389734	4, College Yard	Q26669164
Nos. 5 And 5A With Attached Railings And Rear Courtyard Walls	II	5 and 5a, College Yard			22 May 1954	SO8497654594; 52°11′22″N 2°13′16″W		1389736	Nos. 5 And 5A With Attached Railings And Rear Courtyard Walls	Q26669166
6, College Yard	II	6, College Yard			22 May 1954	SO8497454585; 52°11′21″N 2°13′16″W		1389737	6, College Yard	Q26669167
No 7 and Attached Wall and Railings and Gate	II	7, College Yard			22 May 1954	SO8497154574; 52°11′21″N 2°13′17″W		1389745	No 7 and Attached Wall and Railings and Gate	Q26669175
No 8 And Attached Walls, Gatepiers And Gate	II	8, College Yard			22 May 1954	SO8496954561; 52°11′21″N 2°13′17″W		1389746	No 8 And Attached Walls, Gatepiers And Gate More images	Q26669176
No 10 With Attached Walls, Railings, Gate And Pier	II	10, College Yard			22 May 1954	SO8494154546; 52°11′20″N 2°13′18″W		1389747	No 10 With Attached Walls, Railings, Gate And Pier More images	Q26669177
12, Corn Market	II	12, Corn Market, WR1 2DF			5 April 1971	SO8514054981; 52°11′34″N 2°13′08″W		1389754	Upload Photo	Q26669183
Church of St Martin	II*	Cornmarket			22 May 1954	SO8513455002; 52°11′35″N 2°13′08″W		1389755	Church of St Martin More images	Q17548120
1, 2 and 3, Cornmarket	II	1, 2 and 3, Cornmarket			5 April 1971	SO8515954953; 52°11′33″N 2°13′07″W		1389750	Upload Photo	Q26669180
6-9, Cornmarket	II	6-9, Cornmarket			22 May 1954	SO8519554962; 52°11′34″N 2°13′05″W		1389752	Upload Photo	Q26669181
10, Cornmarket	II	10, Cornmarket			8 March 1974	SO8518854978; 52°11′34″N 2°13′05″W		1389753	Upload Photo	Q26669182
Church of All Saints	II*	Deansway, WR1 2JJ			22 May 1954	SO8478554875; 52°11′31″N 2°13′26″W		1063890	Church of All Saints More images	Q17548087
Magg's Day Centre	II	Deansway, WR1 2JD			22 May 1954	SO8491754707; 52°11′25″N 2°13′19″W		1389796	Magg's Day Centre More images	Q17641793
Walls, Gates And Gate Piers To The Old Palace	II	Deansway			19 August 1999	SO8495554637; 52°11′23″N 2°13′17″W		1389764	Upload Photo	Q26669190
Former Stables and Coach House to the Old Palace	II	1-5, Deansway			5 April 1971	SO8496854595; 52°11′22″N 2°13′17″W		1389761	Upload Photo	Q26669189
The Old Palace	I	4, Deansway			22 May 1954	SO8491354629; 52°11′23″N 2°13′20″W		1389763	The Old Palace More images	Q17530378
No 5 and Attached Boundary Wall	II	5, Deansway			5 April 1971	SO8499854644; 52°11′23″N 2°13′15″W		1389759	No 5 and Attached Boundary Wall	Q26669187
Offices To Rear Of Huntingdon Hall At No 16	II	16, Deansway			22 May 1954	SO8489454842; 52°11′30″N 2°13′21″W		1389760	Upload Photo	Q26669188
2, Edgar Street	II	2, Edgar Street			22 May 1954	SO8511054436; 52°11′17″N 2°13′09″W		1389775	Upload Photo	Q26669201
3, Edgar Street	II*	3, Edgar Street			22 May 1954	SO8511854438; 52°11′17″N 2°13′09″W		1389776	Upload Photo	Q17548130
4, Edgar Street	II	4, Edgar Street			22 May 1954	SO8512454437; 52°11′17″N 2°13′08″W		1389777	Upload Photo	Q26669202
5, Edgar Street	II	5, Edgar Street			22 May 1954	SO8512854444; 52°11′17″N 2°13′08″W		1389778	Upload Photo	Q26669203
6, Edgar Street	II	6, Edgar Street			22 May 1954	SO8513454445; 52°11′17″N 2°13′08″W		1389779	Upload Photo	Q26669204
7 Edgar Street	II	7, Edgar Street			22 May 1954	SO8514054444; 52°11′17″N 2°13′08″W		1389780	Upload Photo	Q26669205
8, Edgar Street	II	8, Edgar Street			5 April 1971	SO8513454470; 52°11′18″N 2°13′08″W		1389781	Upload Photo	Q26669206
9, Edgar Street	II	9, Edgar Street			5 April 1971	SO8512954468; 52°11′18″N 2°13′08″W		1389782	Upload Photo	Q26669207
10, Edgar Street	II	10, Edgar Street			22 May 1954	SO8512454467; 52°11′18″N 2°13′08″W		1389783	Upload Photo	Q26669208
11 and 12, Edgar Street	II	11 and 12, Edgar Street			22 May 1954	SO8511754464; 52°11′18″N 2°13′09″W		1389784	Upload Photo	Q26669209
13, Edgar Street	II	13, Edgar Street			22 May 1954	SO8510954462; 52°11′18″N 2°13′09″W		1389785	Upload Photo	Q26669210
14, Edgar Street	II	14, Edgar Street			22 May 1954	SO8510454460; 52°11′17″N 2°13′10″W		1389786	Upload Photo	Q26669211
15 and 16, Edgar Street	II	15 and 16, Edgar Street			22 May 1954	SO8510054459; 52°11′17″N 2°13′10″W		1389787	Upload Photo	Q26669212
46, Foregate Street and 16, Farrier Street	II	16, Farrier Street, WR1 3BH			22 May 1954	SO8488855289; 52°11′44″N 2°13′21″W		1389821	Upload Photo	Q26669247
Church of St Helen	II*	Fish Street			22 May 1954	SO8501054708; 52°11′25″N 2°13′15″W		1389795	Church of St Helen More images	Q17548134
3, 5 and 7, Fish Street	II	3, 5 and 7, Fish Street			8 March 1974	SO8500954686; 52°11′25″N 2°13′15″W		1389791	3, 5 and 7, Fish Street More images	Q26669217
Farriers Arms Public House	II	9, Fish Street			22 May 1954	SO8499654683; 52°11′25″N 2°13′15″W		1389792	Farriers Arms Public House More images	Q26669218
Tudor Cottage	II	21, Fish Street			22 May 1954	SO8496654685; 52°11′25″N 2°13′17″W		1389793	Tudor Cottage More images	Q26669219
Plough Inn	II	23, Fish Street			8 March 1974	SO8496054685; 52°11′25″N 2°13′17″W		1389794	Plough Inn More images	Q26669220
City Museum and Library with Gates	II*	Foregate Street			5 April 1971	SO8490755372; 52°11′47″N 2°13′20″W		1389828	City Museum and Library with Gates More images	Q17548140
North Wing Pavilion at Shire Hall	II	Foregate Street			5 April 1971	SO8488055425; 52°11′49″N 2°13′21″W		1389829	North Wing Pavilion at Shire Hall	Q26669254
Railway Bridge	II	Foregate Street			19 August 1999	SO8492655228; 52°11′42″N 2°13′19″W		1389830	Railway Bridge More images	Q26669255
Shire Hall	II*	Foregate Street			22 May 1954	SO8492255420; 52°11′48″N 2°13′19″W		1389831	Shire Hall More images	Q17548145
South Wing Pavilion at Shire Hall	II	Foregate Street			5 April 1971	SO8489155381; 52°11′47″N 2°13′21″W		1389832	South Wing Pavilion at Shire Hall	Q26669256
Statue of Queen Victoria Approximately 15 Metres to West of Shire Hall	II	Foregate Street			5 April 1971	SO8488655404; 52°11′48″N 2°13′21″W		1389833	Statue of Queen Victoria Approximately 15 Metres to West of Shire Hall More images	Q26669257
1 and 1a, Foregate Street	II	1 and 1a, Foregate Street, WR1 1DB			19 August 1999	SO8495855150; 52°11′40″N 2°13′17″W		1389797	Upload Photo	Q26669222
2, Foregate Street	II	2, Foregate Street, WR1 1DB			8 March 1974	SO8496055157; 52°11′40″N 2°13′17″W		1389798	Upload Photo	Q26669223
3, Foregate Street	II	3, Foregate Street, WR1 1DB			8 March 1974	SO8495955164; 52°11′40″N 2°13′17″W		1389799	Upload Photo	Q26669224
4, Foregate Street	II	4, Foregate Street, WR1 1DB			8 March 1974	SO8495955171; 52°11′40″N 2°13′17″W		1389800	Upload Photo	Q26669225
5, Foregate Street	II	5, Foregate Street, WR1 1DB			22 May 1954	SO8495855179; 52°11′41″N 2°13′17″W		1389801	Upload Photo	Q26669226
6 and 6a, Foregate Street	II	6 and 6a, Foregate Street, WR1 1DB			5 April 1971	SO8495555188; 52°11′41″N 2°13′17″W		1389802	Upload Photo	Q26669227
15, Foregate Street	II	15, Foregate Street, WR1 1DB			8 March 1974	SO8493255260; 52°11′43″N 2°13′19″W		1389803	Upload Photo	Q26669228
19, Foregate Street	II	19, Foregate Street, WR1 1DU			22 May 1954	SO8492855295; 52°11′44″N 2°13′19″W		1389804	19, Foregate Street	Q26669229
22, Foregate Street	II	22, Foregate Street			22 May 1954	SO8490755328; 52°11′46″N 2°13′20″W		1389805	22, Foregate Street	Q26669230
23, Foregate Street	II	23, Foregate Street			22 May 1954	SO8490755336; 52°11′46″N 2°13′20″W		1389806	23, Foregate Street	Q26669231
24, Foregate Street	II	24, Foregate Street			8 March 1974	SO8490455346; 52°11′46″N 2°13′20″W		1389807	24, Foregate Street	Q26669232
28, Foregate Street	II	28, Foregate Street			22 May 1954	SO8487455429; 52°11′49″N 2°13′22″W		1389808	Upload Photo	Q26669233
29 and 30, Foregate Street	II	29 and 30, Foregate Street			22 May 1954	SO8486155445; 52°11′49″N 2°13′22″W		1389809	29 and 30, Foregate Street	Q26669234
Restdale House	II	33, Foregate Street			22 May 1954	SO8484655403; 52°11′48″N 2°13′23″W		1389810	Upload Photo	Q26669235
34 and 34a, Foregate Street	II	34 and 34a, Foregate Street			5 April 1971	SO8484655394; 52°11′48″N 2°13′23″W		1389811	Upload Photo	Q26669236
35, Foregate Street	II	35, Foregate Street			5 April 1971	SO8485355386; 52°11′47″N 2°13′23″W		1389812	35, Foregate Street	Q26669237
37, Foregate Street	II	37, Foregate Street			22 May 1954	SO8485855372; 52°11′47″N 2°13′23″W		1389813	37, Foregate Street	Q26669238
38, Foregate Street	II	38, Foregate Street			22 May 1954	SO8485955365; 52°11′47″N 2°13′23″W		1389814	38, Foregate Street	Q26669239
39 (Vinegar House) And Attached Wall To South	II	39 (vinegar House) And Attached Wall To South, Foregate Street, WR1 1DJ			22 May 1954	SO8486555359; 52°11′47″N 2°13′22″W		1389815	39 (Vinegar House) And Attached Wall To South	Q26669241
40, Foregate Street	II	40, Foregate Street, WR1 1EE			22 May 1954	SO8487055344; 52°11′46″N 2°13′22″W		1389816	Upload Photo	Q26669242
41, Foregate Street	II	41, Foregate Street, WR1 1EE			22 May 1954	SO8487155334; 52°11′46″N 2°13′22″W		1389817	Upload Photo	Q26669243
42, Foregate Street	II	42, Foregate Street, WR1 1EE			22 May 1954	SO8487555326; 52°11′45″N 2°13′22″W		1389818	Upload Photo	Q26669244
43, Foregate Street	II	43, Foregate Street, WR1 1EE			22 May 1954	SO8488055316; 52°11′45″N 2°13′21″W		1389819	Upload Photo	Q26669245
45, Foregate Street	II	45, Foregate Street, WR1 1EE			22 May 1954	SO8488755294; 52°11′44″N 2°13′21″W		1389820	Upload Photo	Q26669246
49, Foregate Street	II	49, Foregate Street, WR1 1EE			8 March 1974	SO8489955267; 52°11′44″N 2°13′20″W		1389822	Upload Photo	Q26669248
57, Foregate Street	II	57, Foregate Street, WR1 1DX			8 March 1974	SO8491855212; 52°11′42″N 2°13′19″W		1389823	Upload Photo	Q26669249
58, Foregate Street	II	58, Foregate Street, WR1 1DX			19 August 1999	SO8492255205; 52°11′42″N 2°13′19″W		1389824	Upload Photo	Q26669250
59 and 60, Foregate Street	II	59 and 60, Foregate Street, WR1 1DX			5 April 1971	SO8492555196; 52°11′41″N 2°13′19″W		1389825	Upload Photo	Q26669251
Star Hotel	II	61 and 62, Foregate Street			5 April 1971	SO8491055176; 52°11′41″N 2°13′20″W		1389826	Upload Photo	Q26669252
The Greyfriars	I	Friar Street			22 May 1954	SO8513954720; 52°11′26″N 2°13′08″W		1389859	The Greyfriars More images	Q5608384
Ye Olde Talbot Hotel	II	Friar Street			22 May 1954	SO8513554546; 52°11′20″N 2°13′08″W		1389860	Ye Olde Talbot Hotel More images	Q26669281
Eagle Vaults Public House	II	2, Friar Street			22 May 1954	SO8512954750; 52°11′27″N 2°13′08″W		1389835	Eagle Vaults Public House More images	Q26669259
4 and 6, Friar Street	II	4 and 6, Friar Street			22 May 1954	SO8512654739; 52°11′26″N 2°13′08″W		1389836	4 and 6, Friar Street	Q26669260
5, Friar Street	II	5, Friar Street			5 April 1971	SO8514754739; 52°11′26″N 2°13′07″W		1389837	5, Friar Street	Q26669261
7, Friar Street	II	7, Friar Street			22 May 1954	SO8513954733; 52°11′26″N 2°13′08″W		1389838	Upload Photo	Q26669262
8, 10 and 12, Friar Street	II	8, 10 and 12, Friar Street			8 March 1974	SO8512454729; 52°11′26″N 2°13′09″W		1389839	8, 10 and 12, Friar Street	Q26669264
14, 16 and 18, Friar Street	II*	14, 16 and 18, Friar Street			22 May 1954	SO8512554717; 52°11′26″N 2°13′08″W		1389840	14, 16 and 18, Friar Street More images	Q17548150
19, Friar Street	II	19, Friar Street			5 April 1971	SO8515154654; 52°11′24″N 2°13′07″W		1389841	Upload Photo	Q26669265
21 and 23, Friar Street	II	21 and 23, Friar Street			5 April 1971	SO8515154646; 52°11′23″N 2°13′07″W		1389842	Upload Photo	Q26669266
22, Friar Street	II	22, Friar Street			22 May 1954	SO8512554698; 52°11′25″N 2°13′08″W		1389843	Upload Photo	Q26669267
24, Friar Street	II	24, Friar Street			5 April 1971	SO8512554692; 52°11′25″N 2°13′08″W		1389844	Upload Photo	Q26669268
25, Friar Street	II	25, Friar Street			22 May 1954	SO8515554638; 52°11′23″N 2°13′07″W		1389845	Upload Photo	Q26669269
26-32, Friar Street	II*	26-32, Friar Street			22 May 1954	SO8512854683; 52°11′25″N 2°13′08″W		1389846	26-32, Friar Street More images	Q17548155
27 and 27a, Friar Street	II	27 and 27a, Friar Street			22 May 1954	SO8515454623; 52°11′23″N 2°13′07″W		1389847	Upload Photo	Q26669270
29, Friar Street	II	29, Friar Street			5 April 1971	SO8515554614; 52°11′22″N 2°13′07″W		1389848	Upload Photo	Q26669271
The Cardinal's Hat Public House	II	31, Friar Street			5 April 1971	SO8515654607; 52°11′22″N 2°13′07″W		1389849	The Cardinal's Hat Public House More images	Q26669272
33 And 35, Friar Street	II	33 and 35, Friar Street			5 April 1971	SO8515354588; 52°11′22″N 2°13′07″W		1389850	33 And 35, Friar Street	Q26669273
37, Friar Street	II	37, Friar Street			5 April 1971	SO8515254577; 52°11′21″N 2°13′07″W		1389851	Upload Photo	Q26669274
Tudor House Museum	II*	38-42, Friar Street			22 May 1954	SO8513554654; 52°11′24″N 2°13′08″W		1389852	Tudor House Museum More images	Q17548160
39, Friar Street	II	39, Friar Street			5 April 1971	SO8515554569; 52°11′21″N 2°13′07″W		1389853	Upload Photo	Q26669275
41, Friar Street	II	41, Friar Street			5 April 1971	SO8515354562; 52°11′21″N 2°13′07″W		1389854	Upload Photo	Q26669276
43, Friar Street	II	43, Friar Street			22 May 1954	SO8515354556; 52°11′21″N 2°13′07″W		1389855	Upload Photo	Q26669277
44, Friar Street	II	44, Friar Street			22 May 1954	SO8513354641; 52°11′23″N 2°13′08″W		1389856	Upload Photo	Q26669278
45 and 47, Friar Street	II	45 and 47, Friar Street			22 May 1954	SO8515254547; 52°11′20″N 2°13′07″W		1389857	Upload Photo	Q26669279
46 and 48, Friar Street	II	46 and 48, Friar Street			22 May 1954	SO8513554633; 52°11′23″N 2°13′08″W		1389858	Upload Photo	Q26669280
Guildhall	I	High Street			22 May 1954	SO8500354790; 52°11′28″N 2°13′15″W		1389921	Guildhall More images	Q17530382
Wrought Iron Gates and Railings to Forecourt at Guildhall	I	High Street			5 April 1971	SO8501654793; 52°11′28″N 2°13′14″W		1389922	Wrought Iron Gates and Railings to Forecourt at Guildhall More images	Q17530386
Compton Buildings	II	25, High Street			5 April 1971	SO8504354752; 52°11′27″N 2°13′13″W		1389890	Compton Buildings More images	Q26669313
26, High Street	II	26, High Street			5 April 1971	SO8504454759; 52°11′27″N 2°13′13″W		1389891	Upload Photo	Q26669314
27, High Street	II	27, High Street			5 April 1971	SO8504354767; 52°11′27″N 2°13′13″W		1389892	Upload Photo	Q26669315
30, High Street	II	30, High Street, WR1 2QL			5 April 1971	SO8504654796; 52°11′28″N 2°13′13″W		1389893	Upload Photo	Q26669317
31, High Street	II	31, High Street, WR1 2QL			22 May 1954	SO8504454804; 52°11′29″N 2°13′13″W		1389894	Upload Photo	Q26669318
33, High Street	II	33, High Street			5 April 1971	SO8503454806; 52°11′29″N 2°13′13″W		1389895	Upload Photo	Q26669319
34, High Street	II	34, High Street			5 April 1971	SO8503354813; 52°11′29″N 2°13′13″W		1389896	Upload Photo	Q26669320
59 and 60, High Street	II	59 and 60, High Street			19 August 1999	SO8500154971; 52°11′34″N 2°13′15″W		1389897	59 and 60, High Street More images	Q26669321
61, High Street	II	61, High Street			22 May 1954	SO8497154977; 52°11′34″N 2°13′17″W		1389898	61, High Street More images	Q26669322
62a and 62b, High Street	II	62a and 62b, High Street			8 March 1974	SO8497154969; 52°11′34″N 2°13′17″W		1389899	Upload Photo	Q26669323
63, High Street	II	63, High Street			8 March 1974	SO8497154963; 52°11′34″N 2°13′17″W		1389900	Upload Photo	Q26669324
64, High Street	II	64, High Street			8 March 1974	SO8497354958; 52°11′34″N 2°13′16″W		1389901	Upload Photo	Q26669325
74 and 75, High Street	II	74 and 75, High Street			8 March 1974	SO8498354893; 52°11′31″N 2°13′16″W		1389903	74 and 75, High Street	Q26669327
76, High Street	II	76, High Street			8 March 1974	SO8498554885; 52°11′31″N 2°13′16″W		1389904	76, High Street	Q26669328
77, High Street	II	77, High Street			8 March 1974	SO8498654880; 52°11′31″N 2°13′16″W		1389905	77, High Street	Q26669329
78, High Street	II	78, High Street			19 August 1999	SO8498854876; 52°11′31″N 2°13′16″W		1389906	78, High Street More images	Q26669330
79 and 80, High Street	II	79 and 80, High Street			8 March 1974	SO8499054870; 52°11′31″N 2°13′16″W		1389907	79 and 80, High Street	Q26669331
81, High Street	II	81, High Street			5 April 1971	SO8499454864; 52°11′31″N 2°13′15″W		1389908	81, High Street	Q26669332
82, High Street	II	82, High Street			5 April 1971	SO8499454858; 52°11′30″N 2°13′15″W		1389909	Upload Photo	Q26669333
83 and 84, High Street	II	83 and 84, High Street			22 May 1954	SO8499454852; 52°11′30″N 2°13′15″W		1389910	Upload Photo	Q26669334
85, High Street	II	85, High Street			5 April 1971	SO8499754841; 52°11′30″N 2°13′15″W		1389911	Upload Photo	Q26669335
95, High Street	II	95, High Street			19 July 1973	SO8502154736; 52°11′26″N 2°13′14″W		1389912	95, High Street	Q26669336
96, High Street	II	96, High Street			5 April 1971	SO8502354728; 52°11′26″N 2°13′14″W		1389913	Upload Photo	Q26669337
97, High Street	II	97, High Street			5 April 1971	SO8502254721; 52°11′26″N 2°13′14″W		1389914	Upload Photo	Q26669338
97a, High Street	II	97a, High Street			5 April 1971	SO8502454691; 52°11′25″N 2°13′14″W		1389915	Upload Photo	Q26669341
98, High Street	II	98, High Street			5 April 1971	SO8502554685; 52°11′25″N 2°13′14″W		1389916	Upload Photo	Q26669342
102, High Street	II	102, High Street			5 April 1971	SO8502054659; 52°11′24″N 2°13′14″W		1389917	Upload Photo	Q26669343
103, High Street	II	103, High Street			5 April 1971	SO8502054652; 52°11′24″N 2°13′14″W		1389918	Upload Photo	Q26669344
104 and 104a, High Street	II	104 and 104a, High Street			19 August 1999	SO8502154646; 52°11′23″N 2°13′14″W		1389919	Upload Photo	Q26669345
106 High Street	II	106, High Street, WR1 2HW			22 May 1954	SO8501554629; 52°11′23″N 2°13′14″W		1389920	106 High Street More images	Q26669346
Boundary Walls to East Side of River Severn Extending North from the Water Gate	II*	Kleve Walk			5 April 1971	SO8489454426; 52°11′16″N 2°13′21″W		1389929	Boundary Walls to East Side of River Severn Extending North from the Water Gate More images	Q17548172
Boundary Walls to East Side of River Severn Extending South from the Water Gate	II*	Kleve Walk			27 June 2001	SO8491054360; 52°11′14″N 2°13′20″W		1389930	Upload Photo	Q17548177
Elim Pentecostal Church	II	Lowesmoor			8 March 1974	SO8530855190; 52°11′41″N 2°12′59″W		1389984	Elim Pentecostal Church	Q26669407
13, 15 and 17, Lowesmoor	II	13, 15 and 17, Lowesmoor			8 March 1974	SO8514755165; 52°11′40″N 2°13′07″W		1389972	Upload Photo	Q26669395
21 and 23, Lowesmoor	II	21 and 23, Lowesmoor			18 August 1999	SO8517455162; 52°11′40″N 2°13′06″W		1389973	Upload Photo	Q26669396
24-30, Lowesmoor	II	24-30, Lowesmoor			8 March 1974	SO8519755150; 52°11′40″N 2°13′05″W		1389974	Upload Photo	Q26669397
31, 33 and 35, Lowesmoor	II	31, 33 and 35, Lowesmoor			8 March 1974	SO8519855169; 52°11′40″N 2°13′05″W		1389975	Upload Photo	Q26669398
32, 34 and 34a, Lowesmoor	II	32, 34 and 34a, Lowesmoor			8 March 1974	SO8521055153; 52°11′40″N 2°13′04″W		1389976	Upload Photo	Q26669399
37, Lowesmoor	II	37, Lowesmoor			8 March 1974	SO8520855172; 52°11′40″N 2°13′04″W		1389977	Upload Photo	Q26669400
43 and 45, Lowesmoor	II	43 and 45, Lowesmoor			8 March 1974	SO8522855181; 52°11′41″N 2°13′03″W		1389978	Upload Photo	Q26669401
47, Lowesmoor	II	47, Lowesmoor			8 March 1974	SO8523455185; 52°11′41″N 2°13′03″W		1389979	Upload Photo	Q26669402
Nos 49, 51A, 51B, And 53 (The Pig And Drum), Lowesmoor	II	51a, 51b, And 53 (the Pig And Drum), Lowesmoor			8 March 1974	SO8524355188; 52°11′41″N 2°13′02″W		1389980	Upload Photo	Q26669403
No 54 and Attached Railings	II	54, Lowesmoor			8 March 1974	SO8528855177; 52°11′41″N 2°13′00″W		1389981	No 54 and Attached Railings More images	Q26669404
55 and 57, Lowesmoor	II	55 and 57, Lowesmoor			8 March 1974	SO8525855192; 52°11′41″N 2°13′02″W		1389982	Upload Photo	Q26669405
64, Lowesmoor	II	64, Lowesmoor			18 August 1999	SO8531655194; 52°11′41″N 2°12′58″W		1389983	64, Lowesmoor	Q26669406
1, 2 and 3, Mealcheapen Street	II	1, 2 and 3, Mealcheapen Street			5 April 1971	SO8508154950; 52°11′33″N 2°13′11″W		1389995	Upload Photo	Q26669419
4 and 5, Mealcheapen Street	II	4 and 5, Mealcheapen Street, WR1 2DH			5 April 1971	SO8509654948; 52°11′33″N 2°13′10″W		1389996	Upload Photo	Q26669420
6, Mealcheapen Street	II	6, Mealcheapen Street			5 April 1971	SO8510554948; 52°11′33″N 2°13′10″W		1389997	Upload Photo	Q26669421
7 and 8, Mealcheapen Street	II	7 and 8, Mealcheapen Street			5 April 1971	SO8511554948; 52°11′33″N 2°13′09″W		1389998	Upload Photo	Q26669422
Reindeer Court	II	9, Mealcheapen Street			22 May 1954	SO8512754948; 52°11′33″N 2°13′08″W		1389999	Upload Photo	Q26669423
11 and 12, Mealcheapen Street	II	11 and 12, Mealcheapen Street			5 April 1971	SO8514454952; 52°11′33″N 2°13′07″W		1390000	Upload Photo	Q26669424
Royal Exchange	II	13, Mealcheapen Street			18 February 1999	SO8514154969; 52°11′34″N 2°13′08″W		1390001	Royal Exchange More images	Q26669425
14, Mealcheapen Street	II	14, Mealcheapen Street			5 April 1971	SO8513654965; 52°11′34″N 2°13′08″W		1390002	Upload Photo	Q26669426
15, Mealcheapen Street	II	15, Mealcheapen Street			22 May 1954	SO8513054965; 52°11′34″N 2°13′08″W		1390003	Upload Photo	Q26669427
16, Mealcheapen Street	II	16, Mealcheapen Street			22 May 1954	SO8512154967; 52°11′34″N 2°13′09″W		1390004	Upload Photo	Q26669428
20, Mealcheapen Street	II	20, Mealcheapen Street			5 April 1971	SO8509554964; 52°11′34″N 2°13′10″W		1390005	Upload Photo	Q26669429
21, Mealcheapen Street	II	21, Mealcheapen Street			5 April 1971	SO8509154966; 52°11′34″N 2°13′10″W		1390006	Upload Photo	Q26669430
23, Mealcheapen Street	II	23, Mealcheapen Street			5 April 1971	SO8508254965; 52°11′34″N 2°13′11″W		1390007	Upload Photo	Q26669431
Market Hall (elevation to New Street Only)	II	New Street			8 March 1974	SO8514254814; 52°11′29″N 2°13′08″W		1390023	Upload Photo	Q26669444
2 and 3, New Street	II	2 and 3, New Street			8 March 1974	SO8515254775; 52°11′28″N 2°13′07″W		1390008	2 and 3, New Street	Q26669432
4 and 5, New Street	II	4 and 5, New Street			5 April 1971	SO8515454788; 52°11′28″N 2°13′07″W		1390009	4 and 5, New Street	Q26669433
6, 7 And 7A (Nash House), New Street	II*	6, 7 and 7a, New Street			22 May 1954	SO8515254800; 52°11′28″N 2°13′07″W		1390010	6, 7 And 7A (Nash House), New Street More images	Q17548182
No 9 and Oddfellows Hall	II	9, New Street			5 April 1971	SO8515254812; 52°11′29″N 2°13′07″W		1390011	Upload Photo	Q26669434
10, New Street	II	10, New Street			5 April 1971	SO8515854819; 52°11′29″N 2°13′07″W		1390012	10, New Street More images	Q26669435
11 and 12, New Street	II	11 and 12, New Street			22 May 1954	SO8515654827; 52°11′29″N 2°13′07″W		1390013	11 and 12, New Street More images	Q26669436
15, New Street	II	15, New Street			5 April 1971	SO8515654847; 52°11′30″N 2°13′07″W		1390014	15, New Street	Q26669437
16 and 17, New Street	II	16 and 17, New Street			8 March 1974	SO8515854855; 52°11′30″N 2°13′07″W		1390015	16 and 17, New Street	Q26669438
The Pheasant	II*	25, New Street			22 May 1954	SO8516954898; 52°11′32″N 2°13′06″W		1390016	The Pheasant More images	Q17548188
26, New Street	II	26, New Street			5 April 1971	SO8517354906; 52°11′32″N 2°13′06″W		1390017	26, New Street	Q26669439
27, New Street	II	27, New Street			8 March 1974	SO8518854914; 52°11′32″N 2°13′05″W		1390018	27, New Street	Q26669440
Swan with Two Nicks	II	28, New Street			8 March 1974	SO8517854925; 52°11′33″N 2°13′06″W		1390019	Swan with Two Nicks More images	Q26669441
King Charles House	II*	29, New Street			22 May 1954	SO8518854931; 52°11′33″N 2°13′05″W		1390020	King Charles House More images	Q17548193
King Charles House	II*	30, New Street			22 May 1954	SO8518554943; 52°11′33″N 2°13′05″W		1389751	King Charles House More images	Q17548114
45, 46 (The Greyhound) And 47 New Street	II	45, 46 (the Greyhound) And 47, New Street, WR1 2DL			8 March 1974	SO8514254868; 52°11′31″N 2°13′08″W		1390021	45, 46 (The Greyhound) And 47 New Street More images	Q26669442
49 and 50, New Street	II	49 and 50, New Street			8 March 1974	SO8513954840; 52°11′30″N 2°13′08″W		1390022	Upload Photo	Q26669443
2, North Parade	II	2, North Parade			18 August 1999	SO8465254846; 52°11′30″N 2°13′33″W		1390024	2, North Parade More images	Q26669445
Severn View Hotel	II	North Quay			8 March 1974	SO8457854910; 52°11′32″N 2°13′37″W		1390025	Severn View Hotel More images	Q26669447
4 and 5, Pierpoint Street	II	4 and 5, Pierpoint Street			5 April 1971	SO8497655293; 52°11′44″N 2°13′16″W		1390036	Upload Photo	Q26669456
6, Pierpoint Street	II	6, Pierpoint Street			5 April 1971	SO8498355297; 52°11′45″N 2°13′16″W		1390037	Upload Photo	Q26669457
7, Pierpoint Street	II	7, Pierpoint Street			5 April 1971	SO8499155297; 52°11′45″N 2°13′16″W		1390038	Upload Photo	Q26669458
8, Pierpoint Street	II	8, Pierpoint Street			5 April 1971	SO8500055301; 52°11′45″N 2°13′15″W		1390039	Upload Photo	Q26669459
11, Pierpoint Street	II	11, Pierpoint Street			5 April 1971	SO8502355285; 52°11′44″N 2°13′14″W		1390040	Upload Photo	Q26669460
12 and 12a, Pierpoint Street	II	12 and 12a, Pierpoint Street			8 March 1974	SO8501355286; 52°11′44″N 2°13′14″W		1390041	Upload Photo	Q26669461
13, Pierpoint Street	II	13, Pierpoint Street			5 April 1971	SO8500155275; 52°11′44″N 2°13′15″W		1390042	Upload Photo	Q26669462
Merchants House	II	Quay Street			5 April 1971	SO8476054784; 52°11′28″N 2°13′28″W		1390043	Upload Photo	Q26669463
Church of St George (roman Catholic)	II*	Sansome Place, WR1 1UG			22 May 1954	SO8509155182; 52°11′41″N 2°13′10″W		1390134	Church of St George (roman Catholic) More images	Q15979350
Friends' Meeting House	II	Sansome Place			22 May 1954	SO8500955217; 52°11′42″N 2°13′15″W		1390135	Upload Photo	Q26669553
Pair of Lamp Standards Approximately 7 Metres to West of West Front of Church of St George	II	Sansome Place			5 April 1971	SO8507055174; 52°11′41″N 2°13′11″W		1390137	Upload Photo	Q26669555
1 And 2 Sansome Place	II	1 and 2, Sansome Place			2 March 1976	SO8506955191; 52°11′41″N 2°13′11″W		1390129	Upload Photo	Q26669548
3, 4 and 5, Sansome Place	II	3, 4 and 5, Sansome Place			8 March 1974	SO8508155212; 52°11′42″N 2°13′11″W		1390130	Upload Photo	Q26669549
Friends' Mews	II	4-9, Sansome Place			16 February 1976	SO8499655209; 52°11′42″N 2°13′15″W		1390136	Upload Photo	Q26669554
6, Sansome Place	II	6, Sansome Place			18 August 1999	SO8506455220; 52°11′42″N 2°13′12″W		1390131	Upload Photo	Q26669550
7-11 Sansome Place	II	7-11, Sansome Place			18 August 1999	SO8507255231; 52°11′42″N 2°13′11″W		1390132	Upload Photo	Q26669551
12, 13 and 14, Sansome Place	II	12, 13 and 14, Sansome Place			18 August 1999	SO8510155246; 52°11′43″N 2°13′10″W		1390133	Upload Photo	Q26669552
3-7 and 7a, Sansome Street	II	3-7 and 7a, Sansome Street			8 March 1974	SO8496955157; 52°11′40″N 2°13′17″W		1390138	Upload Photo	Q26669556
Baptist Church	II	Sansome Walk			18 August 1999	SO8503755385; 52°11′47″N 2°13′13″W		1390142	Baptist Church More images	Q26669560
Church of St Mary Magdelene	II	Sansome Walk			5 April 1971	SO8498255546; 52°11′53″N 2°13′16″W		1390143	Church of St Mary Magdelene More images	Q26669561
Judges Lodgings and Attached Railings	II*	Sansome Walk			5 April 1971	SO8495555428; 52°11′49″N 2°13′18″W		1390144	Upload Photo	Q17548208
Victoria Institute With Attached Wall, Piers And Gates	II	Sansome Walk			5 April 1971	SO8496455389; 52°11′48″N 2°13′17″W		1390145	Victoria Institute With Attached Wall, Piers And Gates	Q26669562
Sansome Lodge (no 4) and Sansome House (no 6)	II	4 and 6, Sansome Walk			22 May 1954	SO8504955306; 52°11′45″N 2°13′13″W		1390139	Upload Photo	Q26669557
15, Sansome Walk	II	15, Sansome Walk			22 May 1954	SO8499255378; 52°11′47″N 2°13′16″W		1390140	Upload Photo	Q26669558
24, Sansome Walk	II	24, Sansome Walk			16 August 1979	SO8499455461; 52°11′50″N 2°13′15″W		1390141	Upload Photo	Q26669559
Diglis Hotel	II	Severn Street			22 May 1954	SO8491054246; 52°11′11″N 2°13′20″W		1390148	Diglis Hotel More images	Q26669565
Royal Worcester Porcelain Works: Pan Grinding Shop and Attached Buildings	II*	Severn Street			15 March 1990	SO8517254288; 52°11′12″N 2°13′06″W		1390149	Upload Photo	Q17548213
Royal Worcester Porcelain Showroom, Now Restaurant	II	Severn Street			5 April 1971	SO8514454312; 52°11′13″N 2°13′07″W		1390150	Upload Photo	Q26669566
St Alban's House (now Part of King's School)	II	Severn Street			5 April 1971	SO8493254223; 52°11′10″N 2°13′19″W		1390151	Upload Photo	Q26669567
Tower House	II	1, Severn Street			5 April 1971	SO8509454419; 52°11′16″N 2°13′10″W		1390147	Tower House More images	Q26669564
4-40, Severn Terrace	II	4-40, Severn Terrace			8 March 1974	SO8454955374; 52°11′47″N 2°13′39″W		1390152	Upload Photo	Q26669568
Old Assembly Room	II*	Shaw Street			22 May 1954	SO8489955155; 52°11′40″N 2°13′20″W		1390155	Old Assembly Room More images	Q17548217
Victoria House	II	1, Shaw Street, WR1 3QQ			22 May 1954	SO8492955150; 52°11′40″N 2°13′19″W		1389827	Upload Photo	Q26669253
3 and 4, Shaw Street	II	3 and 4, Shaw Street, WR1 3QQ			5 April 1971	SO8489155142; 52°11′39″N 2°13′21″W		1390153	Upload Photo	Q26669569
Bank House	II	6 and 7, Shaw Street			5 April 1971	SO8485455138; 52°11′39″N 2°13′23″W		1390154	Upload Photo	Q26669570
26-30, Sidbury	II	26-30, Sidbury			5 April 1971	SO8514054471; 52°11′18″N 2°13′08″W		1390159	Upload Photo	Q26669573
32, Sidbury	II	32, Sidbury			5 April 1971	SO8514854450; 52°11′17″N 2°13′07″W		1390160	Upload Photo	Q26669574
34, Sidbury	II	34, Sidbury			5 April 1971	SO8515354448; 52°11′17″N 2°13′07″W		1390161	Upload Photo	Q26669575
57, Sidbury	II	57, Sidbury			5 April 1971	SO8520654440; 52°11′17″N 2°13′04″W		1390162	Upload Photo	Q26669576
59, Sidbury	II	59, Sidbury			8 March 1974	SO8521054436; 52°11′17″N 2°13′04″W		1390163	Upload Photo	Q26669577
61, Sidbury	II	61, Sidbury			8 March 1974	SO8521554430; 52°11′16″N 2°13′04″W		1390164	Upload Photo	Q26669578
63 and 65, Sidbury	II	63 and 65, Sidbury			5 April 1971	SO8522054425; 52°11′16″N 2°13′03″W		1390165	Upload Photo	Q26669579
King's Head Public House	II	67 and 69, Sidbury			5 April 1971	SO8522854412; 52°11′16″N 2°13′03″W		1390166	King's Head Public House More images	Q26669580
18 and 20, Silver Street	II	18 and 20, Silver Street			8 March 1974	SO8518755087; 52°11′38″N 2°13′05″W		1390177	Upload Photo	Q26669590
Band House	II	South Quay			5 April 1971	SO8476454762; 52°11′27″N 2°13′27″W		1390179	Upload Photo	Q26669592
Gascoyne House (flat Nos 1-7 Consecutive)	II	South Quay			5 April 1971	SO8474654778; 52°11′28″N 2°13′28″W		1390180	Upload Photo	Q26669593
Brown's Restaurant	II	24, South Quay			5 April 1971	SO8475954775; 52°11′28″N 2°13′28″W		1390178	Brown's Restaurant More images	Q26669591
The Old Vinegar Works	II	St Martin's Street, Lowesmoor			8 March 1974	SO8533755123; 52°11′39″N 2°12′57″W		1390121	The Old Vinegar Works	Q26669540
1, St Nicholas Street	II	1, St Nicholas Street			5 April 1971	SO8498055090; 52°11′38″N 2°13′16″W		1390122	Upload Photo	Q26669541
37, St Nicholas Street	II	37, St Nicholas Street			18 August 1999	SO8508055112; 52°11′39″N 2°13′11″W		1390123	Upload Photo	Q26669542
39 and 39a, St Nicholas Street	II	39 and 39a, St Nicholas Street			18 August 1999	SO8508455115; 52°11′39″N 2°13′11″W		1390124	Upload Photo	Q26669543
Church of St Paul	II	St Paul's Street			25 June 1987	SO8535554854; 52°11′30″N 2°12′56″W		1390125	Church of St Paul More images	Q26669544
War Memorial In St Paul's Churchyard	II	St. Pauls Street, WR1 2BH			4 October 2016	SO8537854852; 52°11′30″N 2°12′55″W		1437495	War Memorial In St Paul's Churchyard More images	Q66477844
2 and 3, St Swithin's Street	II	2 and 3, St Swithin's Street			8 March 1974	SO8501354969; 52°11′34″N 2°13′14″W		1390127	Upload Photo	Q26669546
6 and 7, St Swithin's Street	II	6 and 7, St Swithin's Street			8 March 1974	SO8503554966; 52°11′34″N 2°13′13″W		1390128	Upload Photo	Q26669547
Bushwackers	II*	The Avenue			22 May 1954	SO8503555034; 52°11′36″N 2°13′13″W		1390182	Bushwackers More images	Q17548228
City Wall, N Of Angel Row	II	The Butts			5 April 1971	SO8477655075; 52°11′37″N 2°13′27″W		1390185	Upload Photo	Q26669597
City Wall, Stretching Approx 27M E Of Rack Alley	II	The Butts			5 April 1971	SO8470555040; 52°11′36″N 2°13′31″W		1390186	Upload Photo	Q26669598
The Paul Pry Public House and Attached Rear Wall	II	6, The Butts			17 December 1991	SO8480155121; 52°11′39″N 2°13′26″W		1390183	The Paul Pry Public House and Attached Rear Wall More images	Q26669595
Northwall House	II	11, The Butts			21 May 1986	SO8474655057; 52°11′37″N 2°13′28″W		1390184	Upload Photo	Q26669596
Former Church of St Nicholas	II*	The Cross			22 May 1954	SO8499455059; 52°11′37″N 2°13′15″W		1390194	Former Church of St Nicholas More images	Q17548238
2 The Cross	II*	2, The Cross, WR1 3PZ			22 May 1954	SO8500355007; 52°11′35″N 2°13′15″W		1390187	2 The Cross More images	Q17548232
3, The Cross	II	3, The Cross			5 April 1971	SO8499455018; 52°11′35″N 2°13′15″W		1390188	3, The Cross More images	Q26669599
Premises Occupied by Lloyd's Bank	II	4, The Cross			22 May 1954	SO8498755038; 52°11′36″N 2°13′16″W		1390189	Premises Occupied by Lloyd's Bank More images	Q26669600
20, The Cross	II	20, The Cross			22 May 1954	SO8495155069; 52°11′37″N 2°13′18″W		1390190	Upload Photo	Q26669601
21, The Cross	II	21, The Cross			22 May 1954	SO8495455063; 52°11′37″N 2°13′18″W		1390191	Upload Photo	Q26669602
28, The Cross	II	28, The Cross			8 March 1974	SO8495955018; 52°11′35″N 2°13′17″W		1390192	Upload Photo	Q26669603
31, The Cross	II	31, The Cross			22 May 1954	SO8496555002; 52°11′35″N 2°13′17″W		1390193	Upload Photo	Q26669604
Berkeley's Hospital: Almshouses With Gatelodges, Piers And Gates	I	The Foregate			22 May 1954	SO8494655122; 52°11′39″N 2°13′18″W		1390200	Berkeley's Hospital: Almshouses With Gatelodges, Piers And Gates More images	Q17530398
Berkeley's Hospital: Chapel	I	The Foregate			22 May 1954	SO8490255117; 52°11′39″N 2°13′20″W		1390199	Berkeley's Hospital: Chapel More images	Q17530394
11, The Foregate	II	11, The Foregate			5 April 1971	SO8497155087; 52°11′38″N 2°13′17″W		1390195	Upload Photo	Q26669605
12, The Foregate	II	12, The Foregate			5 April 1971	SO8497155100; 52°11′38″N 2°13′17″W		1390196	Upload Photo	Q26669606
The Hop Market	II	13, 14 and 15, The Foregate			30 September 1973	SO8496455121; 52°11′39″N 2°13′17″W		1390197	The Hop Market More images	Q26669607
19, The Foregate	II	19, The Foregate			5 April 1971	SO8494555106; 52°11′38″N 2°13′18″W		1390198	Upload Photo	Q26669608
Chapel to St Oswald's Hospital	II	The Tything			5 April 1971	SO8483555659; 52°11′56″N 2°13′24″W		1390235	Upload Photo	Q26669644
St Oswald's Hospital (almshouses and Chaplain's House)	II	The Tything			5 April 1971	SO8478255652; 52°11′56″N 2°13′27″W		1390236	St Oswald's Hospital (almshouses and Chaplain's House) More images	Q26669645
1, The Tything	II	1, The Tything			22 May 1954	SO8485355470; 52°11′50″N 2°13′23″W		1390202	Upload Photo	Q26669610
Saracen's Head Public House	II	4, The Tything			5 April 1971	SO8485055481; 52°11′50″N 2°13′23″W		1390203	Saracen's Head Public House More images	Q26669611
5, 5a, 6 and 6a, The Tything	II	5, 5a, 6 and 6a, The Tything			5 April 1971	SO8483855484; 52°11′51″N 2°13′24″W		1390204	Upload Photo	Q26669613
7 and 8, The Tything	II	7 and 8, The Tything			8 March 1974	SO8483355494; 52°11′51″N 2°13′24″W		1390205	Upload Photo	Q26669614
11, The Tything	II	11, The Tything			5 April 1971	SO8481555527; 52°11′52″N 2°13′25″W		1390206	Upload Photo	Q26669615
13, The Tything	II	13, The Tything			5 April 1971	SO8481155536; 52°11′52″N 2°13′25″W		1390207	Upload Photo	Q26669616
14 and 15, The Tything	II	14 and 15, The Tything			22 May 1954	SO8480755544; 52°11′53″N 2°13′25″W		1390208	Upload Photo	Q26669617
16, The Tything	II	16, The Tything			22 May 1954	SO8480255553; 52°11′53″N 2°13′26″W		1390209	Upload Photo	Q26669618
17, The Tything	II	17, The Tything			8 March 1974	SO8479955561; 52°11′53″N 2°13′26″W		1390210	Upload Photo	Q26669619
18 and 19, The Tything	II	18 and 19, The Tything			18 February 1999	SO8479855567; 52°11′53″N 2°13′26″W		1390211	Upload Photo	Q26669620
20 and 21, The Tything	II	20 and 21, The Tything			22 May 1954	SO8479655578; 52°11′54″N 2°13′26″W		1390212	Upload Photo	Q26669621
22, The Tything	II	22, The Tything			22 May 1954	SO8479455589; 52°11′54″N 2°13′26″W		1390213	Upload Photo	Q26669622
23, The Tything	II	23, The Tything			11 February 1987	SO8481455611; 52°11′55″N 2°13′25″W		1390214	Upload Photo	Q26669623
24 and 25, The Tything	II	24 and 25, The Tything			5 April 1971	SO8475755648; 52°11′56″N 2°13′28″W		1390215	Upload Photo	Q26669624
26 and 27, The Tything	II	26 and 27, The Tything			22 May 1954	SO8475755636; 52°11′55″N 2°13′28″W		1390216	Upload Photo	Q26669625
28 and 28a, The Tything	II	28 and 28a, The Tything			5 April 1971	SO8475755621; 52°11′55″N 2°13′28″W		1390217	Upload Photo	Q26669626
29, The Tything	II	29, The Tything			22 May 1954	SO8475655610; 52°11′55″N 2°13′28″W		1390218	Upload Photo	Q26669627
30 (Lamb And Flag Inn) And 31, The Tything	II	30 and 31, The Tything			5 April 1971	SO8476055602; 52°11′54″N 2°13′28″W		1390219	Upload Photo	Q26669628
32, The Tything	II	32, The Tything			22 May 1954	SO8476155594; 52°11′54″N 2°13′28″W		1390220	Upload Photo	Q26669629
33, 34 (St John's House) And 35, The Tything	II	33, 34 and 35, The Tything			5 April 1971	SO8476255582; 52°11′54″N 2°13′28″W		1390221	Upload Photo	Q26669630
36 and 37, The Tything	II	36 and 37, The Tything			5 April 1971	SO8476655568; 52°11′53″N 2°13′27″W		1390222	Upload Photo	Q26669631
38, The Tything	II	38, The Tything			22 May 1954	SO8476455558; 52°11′53″N 2°13′28″W		1390223	Upload Photo	Q26669632
39, The Tything	II	39, The Tything			5 April 1971	SO8476855552; 52°11′53″N 2°13′27″W		1390224	Upload Photo	Q26669633
40 And 41, The Tything	II	40 and 41, The Tything			5 April 1971	SO8477355546; 52°11′53″N 2°13′27″W		1390225	Upload Photo	Q26669634
41a, 42a and 42, The Tything	II	41a, 42a and 42, The Tything			5 April 1971	SO8478055534; 52°11′52″N 2°13′27″W		1390226	Upload Photo	Q26669635
43 and 44, The Tything	II	43 and 44, The Tything			5 April 1971	SO8478755525; 52°11′52″N 2°13′26″W		1390227	Upload Photo	Q26669636
45-47, The Tything	II	45-47, The Tything			8 March 1974	SO8479355516; 52°11′52″N 2°13′26″W		1390228	Upload Photo	Q26669637
48 and 49, The Tything	II	48 and 49, The Tything			8 March 1974	SO8479955504; 52°11′51″N 2°13′26″W		1390229	Upload Photo	Q26669638
The Dragon Inn	II	51, The Tything			8 March 1974	SO8480755488; 52°11′51″N 2°13′25″W		1390230	The Dragon Inn More images	Q26669639
52, The Tything	II	52, The Tything			8 March 1974	SO8481055483; 52°11′51″N 2°13′25″W		1390231	Upload Photo	Q26669640
53 and 54, The Tything	II	53 and 54, The Tything			8 March 1974	SO8481555474; 52°11′50″N 2°13′25″W		1390232	Upload Photo	Q26669641
57 and 58, The Tything	II	57 and 58, The Tything			22 May 1954	SO8482255458; 52°11′50″N 2°13′25″W		1390233	Upload Photo	Q26669642
61, The Tything	II	61, The Tything			18 February 1999	SO8483555446; 52°11′49″N 2°13′24″W		1390234	Upload Photo	Q26669643
Battenhall Mount (former St Mary's Convent School)	II*	Trinity Street			22 May 1954	SO8507355019; 52°11′36″N 2°13′11″W		1390238	Battenhall Mount (former St Mary's Convent School) More images	Q17548243
Monastic Ruins	II*				22 May 1954	SO8491354487; 52°11′18″N 2°13′20″W		1359629	Monastic Ruins More images	Q17548103
'Unicorn' with entrance to Crowngate Centre	II				5 April 1971	SO8487654953; 52°11′33″N 2°13′22″W		1063880	'Unicorn' with entrance to Crowngate Centre More images	Q26317152
War memorial located to the rear of the Roman Catholic Church of St George	II				28 February 2017	SO8510555178; 52°11′41″N 2°13′10″W		1438745	Upload Photo	Q66478029

== See also ==
- Grade I listed buildings in Worcestershire
- Grade II* listed buildings in Worcestershire

== Sources ==
- Brooks, Alan; Pevsner, Nikolaus (2007), Worcestershire, The Buildings of England, New Haven and London: Yale University Press, ISBN 978-0-300-11298-6
