= Listed buildings in Worcester (outside the centre) =

Buildings in Worcester, England

Worcester is a cathedral city and non-civil parish in Worcestershire, England. It contains 697 listed buildings that are recorded in the National Heritage List for England. Of these 13 are grade I, 40 are grade II* and 644 are grade II.

This list is based on the information retrieved online from Historic England. The quantity of listed buildings in Worcester requires subdivision into geographically defined lists. This list includes all listed buildings located outside city centre.

== Key ==
Grade	Criteria
I	Buildings that are of exceptional interest
II*	Particularly important buildings of more than special interest
II	Buildings that are of special interest

== Listing ==
Name	Grade	Location	Type	Completed (Note: The date given is the date used by Historic England as significant for the initial building or that of an important part in the structure's description.)	Date designated	Grid ref. (Note: The grid reference is based on the British national grid reference system, sometimes known as OSGB36, used by the Ordnance Survey.) Geo-coordinates	Notes	Entry number (Note: The "List Entry Number" is a unique number assigned to each listed building and scheduled monument by Historic England.)	Image	Wikidata
1-11, Albany Terrace	II	1-11, Albany Terrace			8 March 1974	SO8461755803; 52°12′01″N 2°13′35″W		1359587	Upload Photo	Q26641812
The Albany	II	4, Albany Terrace			8 March 1974	SO8460755841; 52°12′02″N 2°13′36″W		1359604	Upload Photo	Q26641828
Nos 6 and 8 and Attached Area Railings	II	6 and 8, Albany Terrace			8 March 1974	SO8459455826; 52°12′02″N 2°13′37″W		1359605	Upload Photo	Q26641829
10, Albany Terrace	II	10, Albany Terrace			8 March 1974	SO8458055819; 52°12′01″N 2°13′37″W		1359606	Upload Photo	Q26641830
12 and 14, Albany Terrace	II	12 and 14, Albany Terrace			8 March 1974	SO8456755811; 52°12′01″N 2°13′38″W		1359607	Upload Photo	Q26641831
16 and 18, Albany Terrace	II	16 and 18, Albany Terrace			8 March 1974	SO8455355803; 52°12′01″N 2°13′39″W		1359608	Upload Photo	Q26641832
Nos 20 and 22 and Attached Area Railings to No 22	II	20 Ans 22, Albany Terrace			8 March 1974	SO8453955796; 52°12′01″N 2°13′39″W		1359609	Upload Photo	Q26641833
24 and 26, Albany Terrace	II	24 and 26, Albany Terrace			8 March 1974	SO8451655782; 52°12′00″N 2°13′41″W		1359610	Upload Photo	Q26641834
27-33, Albany Terrace	II	27-33, Albany Terrace			19 August 1999	SO8451355743; 52°11′59″N 2°13′41″W		1359611	Upload Photo	Q26641835
Nos 28 and 30 and Attached Railings to No 30	II	28 and 30, Albany Terrace			8 March 1974	SO8450355775; 52°12′00″N 2°13′41″W		1359612	Upload Photo	Q26641836
Croft House and Attached Outbuilding and Boundary Wall	II	32, Albany Terrace			8 March 1974	SO8446455753; 52°11′59″N 2°13′43″W		1359613	Upload Photo	Q26641837
35 and 37, Albany Terrace	II	35 and 37, Albany Terrace			8 March 1974	SO8447355715; 52°11′58″N 2°13′43″W		1359626	Upload Photo	Q26641849
Building Adjacent (north Side) to Security House	II	Barbourne Road			1 August 1977	SO8463356054; 52°12′09″N 2°13′35″W		1359560	Upload Photo	Q26641786
Former Worcester Eye Hospital	II	Barbourne Road			5 April 1971	SO8460756073; 52°12′10″N 2°13′36″W		1359568	Upload Photo	Q26641794
2 and 4, Barbourne Road	II	2 and 4, Barbourne Road			8 March 1974	SO8471855905; 52°12′04″N 2°13′30″W		1359552	Upload Photo	Q26641778
6, Barbourne Road	II	6, Barbourne Road			8 March 1974	SO8471755913; 52°12′04″N 2°13′30″W		1359553	Upload Photo	Q26641779
12, Barbourne Road	II	12, Barbourne Road			22 May 1954	SO8470855939; 52°12′05″N 2°13′31″W		1359554	Upload Photo	Q26641780
14 and 16, Barbourne Road	II	14 and 16, Barbourne Road			22 May 1954	SO8470355952; 52°12′06″N 2°13′31″W		1389862	Upload Photo	Q26669283
18 and 20, Barbourne Road	II	18 and 20, Barbourne Road			22 May 1954	SO8469755967; 52°12′06″N 2°13′31″W		1359558	Upload Photo	Q26641784
27 and 29, Barbourne Road	II	27 and 29, Barbourne Road			5 April 1971	SO8460556097; 52°12′10″N 2°13′36″W		1359559	Upload Photo	Q26641785
Nos 1, 2 And 3 And Adjoining Boundary Walls	II	1-3, Barbourne Terrace			27 June 2001	SO8457456246; 52°12′15″N 2°13′38″W		1359571	Upload Photo	Q26641797
No 4 With Attached Area Railings	II	4, Barbourne Terrace			5 April 1971	SO8454056238; 52°12′15″N 2°13′40″W		1359572	Upload Photo	Q26641798
The Hollies	II	5 and 6, Barbourne Terrace			8 March 1974	SO8451156229; 52°12′15″N 2°13′41″W		1359573	Upload Photo	Q26641799
9-12, Barbourne Terrace	II	9-12, Barbourne Terrace			8 March 1974	SO8447456218; 52°12′14″N 2°13′43″W		1359574	Upload Photo	Q26641800
K6 Telephone Kiosk K6 Telephone Kiosk At Junction With Sidbury And London Road	II	Bath Road			4 December 1989	SO8530454296; 52°11′12″N 2°12′59″W		1359584	Upload Photo	Q26641810
6, Bath Road	II	6, Bath Road			5 April 1971	SO8529554314; 52°11′13″N 2°12′59″W		1359575	Upload Photo	Q26641801
Haresfield House	II	8-10, Bath Road			22 May 1954	SO8528754306; 52°11′12″N 2°13′00″W		1359576	Upload Photo	Q26641802
11, 13 and 15, Bath Road	II	11, 13 and 15, Bath Road			5 April 1971	SO8529254266; 52°11′11″N 2°13′00″W		1359577	Upload Photo	Q26641803
16 and 18, Bath Road	II	16 and 18, Bath Road			22 May 1954	SO8526554270; 52°11′11″N 2°13′01″W		1359578	Upload Photo	Q26641804
17, Bath Road	II	17, Bath Road			5 April 1971	SO8528554256; 52°11′11″N 2°13′00″W		1359581	Upload Photo	Q26641807
Nos 19, 21 And 23 And Attached Wall To No 19	II	21 and 23 And Attached Wall To No 19, 19, 21 and 23, Bath Road			8 March 1974	SO8526454234; 52°11′10″N 2°13′01″W		1359580	Upload Photo	Q26641806
58 and 60, Bath Road	II	58 and 60, Bath Road			19 August 1999	SO8516554023; 52°11′03″N 2°13′06″W		1359582	Upload Photo	Q26641808
62 and 64, Bath Road	II	62 and 64, Bath Road			19 August 1999	SO8516454005; 52°11′03″N 2°13′06″W		1359583	Upload Photo	Q26641809
The Stables And Attached Walls And Gate Piers	II	Battenhall Avenue, WR5 2JF			18 February 1999	SO8592453752; 52°10′55″N 2°12′26″W		1063892	Upload Photo	Q26317162
1 and 2, Battenhall Place	II	1 and 2, Battenhall Place			22 May 1954	SO8553554177; 52°11′08″N 2°12′47″W		1359586	Upload Photo	Q26641811
Gatehouse to St Mary's Convent School and Attached Wall to North	II	Battle Road			18 February 1999	SO8588753673; 52°10′52″N 2°12′28″W		1063935	Gatehouse to St Mary's Convent School and Attached Wall to North More images	Q26317203
Electricity Junction Box	II	2 Beckett Drive, WR3 7BZ			31 January 2025	SO8462457693; 52°13′02″N 2°13′35″W		1492102	Upload Photo	Q136386102
Perdiswell Cottage	II	Bilford Road, WR3 8QA			5 February 1973	SO8495157225; 52°12′47″N 2°13′18″W		1063894	Upload Photo	Q26317163
66, Bilford Road	II	66, Bilford Road			15 June 1976	SO8536857117; 52°12′43″N 2°12′56″W		1063896	Upload Photo	Q26317165
45, Boughton Street	II	45, Boughton Street			2 November 1999	SO8362554118; 52°11′06″N 2°14′27″W		1063897	Upload Photo	Q26317166
46 and 47, Boughton Street	II	46 and 47, Boughton Street			2 November 1999	SO8363754127; 52°11′07″N 2°14′27″W		1063906	Upload Photo	Q26317173
Pair of Gate Piers to Worcester Golf and Country Club	II	Bransford Road			2 November 1999	SO8327354055; 52°11′04″N 2°14′46″W		1063916	Upload Photo	Q26317183
Worcester Golf and Country Club and Attached Walls to Former E Walled Garden	II	Bransford Road			5 April 1971	SO8321953702; 52°10′53″N 2°14′49″W		1063917	Upload Photo	Q26317184
Laugherne House	II	26, Bransford Road			5 April 1971	SO8232553829; 52°10′57″N 2°15′36″W		1063907	Upload Photo	Q26317174
Belmont House	II	61, Bransford Road			5 April 1971	SO8379554251; 52°11′11″N 2°14′18″W		1063908	Upload Photo	Q26317175
Mortimer Cottage And Laystone Cottage	II	105, Bransford Road			2 November 1999	SO8352954207; 52°11′09″N 2°14′32″W		1063909	Upload Photo	Q26317176
Hawford Cottage	II	107, Bransford Road			2 November 1999	SO8351654204; 52°11′09″N 2°14′33″W		1063910	Upload Photo	Q26317177
109, Bransford Road	II	109, Bransford Road			8 March 1974	SO8350354195; 52°11′09″N 2°14′34″W		1063911	Upload Photo	Q26317178
Comberton House	II	111, Bransford Road			2 November 1999	SO8348754193; 52°11′09″N 2°14′35″W		1063915	Upload Photo	Q26317182
Albany Lodge	II	Brewery Walk			8 March 1974	SO8466655944; 52°12′05″N 2°13′33″W		1063918	Upload Photo	Q26317185
Old Baskerville	II	Brewery Walk			22 May 1954	SO8459756027; 52°12′08″N 2°13′36″W		1063919	Upload Photo	Q26317186
Paradise House	II	Brewery Walk			8 March 1974	SO8465455936; 52°12′05″N 2°13′33″W		1063920	Upload Photo	Q26317188
Gates and Railings to S Entrance to Springfield	II	Britannia Square			27 June 2001	SO8463955646; 52°11′56″N 2°13′34″W		1063861	Upload Photo	Q26317132
Springfield (alice Otley School)	II	Britannia Square			22 May 1954	SO8459855667; 52°11′56″N 2°13′36″W		1063862	Upload Photo	Q26317133
1, Britannia Square	II	1, Britannia Square			22 May 1954	SO8469255644; 52°11′56″N 2°13′31″W		1063924	Upload Photo	Q26317192
2, Britannia Square	II	2, Britannia Square			22 May 1954	SO8468355638; 52°11′56″N 2°13′32″W		1063925	Upload Photo	Q26317193
3 and 4, Britannia Square	II	3 and 4, Britannia Square			22 May 1954	SO8467255629; 52°11′55″N 2°13′32″W		1063926	Upload Photo	Q26317194
5, Britannia Square	II	5, Britannia Square			22 May 1954	SO8465755619; 52°11′55″N 2°13′33″W		1063927	Upload Photo	Q26317195
6 and 7, Britannia Square	II	6 and 7, Britannia Square			22 May 1954	SO8464255606; 52°11′54″N 2°13′34″W		1063928	Upload Photo	Q26317196
Albion House	II	8 and 9, Britannia Square			22 May 1954	SO8462555595; 52°11′54″N 2°13′35″W		1063929	Upload Photo	Q26317197
10-13, Britannia Square	II	10-13, Britannia Square			22 May 1954	SO8460855582; 52°11′54″N 2°13′36″W		1063930	Upload Photo	Q26317198
14 and 15, Britannia Square	II	14 and 15, Britannia Square			22 May 1954	SO8459355570; 52°11′53″N 2°13′37″W		1063931	Upload Photo	Q26317199
16 and 17, Britannia Square	II	16 and 17, Britannia Square			22 May 1954	SO8458255562; 52°11′53″N 2°13′37″W		1063932	Upload Photo	Q26317200
18 and 19, Britannia Square	II	18 and 19, Britannia Square			22 May 1954	SO8457255554; 52°11′53″N 2°13′38″W		1063936	Upload Photo	Q26317204
20, Britannia Square	II	20, Britannia Square			22 May 1954	SO8456555546; 52°11′53″N 2°13′38″W		1063937	Upload Photo	Q26317205
No 21 and Attached Boundary Wall	II	21, Britannia Square			22 May 1954	SO8453855517; 52°11′52″N 2°13′39″W		1063938	Upload Photo	Q26317206
22, Britannia Square	II	22, Britannia Square			22 May 1954	SO8453255525; 52°11′52″N 2°13′40″W		1063939	Upload Photo	Q26317207
23 and 24, Britannia Square	II	23 and 24, Britannia Square			22 May 1954	SO8452855537; 52°11′52″N 2°13′40″W		1063940	Upload Photo	Q26317208
Nos 25 and 26 and Attached Wall to No 25	II	25 and 26, Britannia Square			22 May 1954	SO8452555550; 52°11′53″N 2°13′40″W		1063941	Upload Photo	Q26317209
27, Britannia Square	II	27, Britannia Square			22 May 1954	SO8452155562; 52°11′53″N 2°13′40″W		1063942	Upload Photo	Q26317210
27a and 27b, Britannia Square	II	27a and 27b, Britannia Square			22 May 1954	SO8451855573; 52°11′53″N 2°13′41″W		1063883	Upload Photo	Q26317155
28 and 29, Britannia Square	II	28 and 29, Britannia Square			22 May 1954	SO8451455585; 52°11′54″N 2°13′41″W		1063841	Upload Photo	Q26317112
30, Britannia Square	II	30, Britannia Square			22 May 1954	SO8450655614; 52°11′55″N 2°13′41″W		1063842	Upload Photo	Q26317113
31-33, Britannia Square	II	31-33, Britannia Square			22 May 1954	SO8449955634; 52°11′55″N 2°13′42″W		1063843	Upload Photo	Q26317114
34, Britannia Square	II	34, Britannia Square			22 May 1954	SO8449655651; 52°11′56″N 2°13′42″W		1063844	Upload Photo	Q26317115
35 and 36, Britannia Square	II	35 and 36, Britannia Square			22 May 1954	SO8449355665; 52°11′56″N 2°13′42″W		1063845	Upload Photo	Q26317116
Ivygate and Attached Boundary Walls and Gate Piers	II	37, Britannia Square			22 May 1954	SO8453855717; 52°11′58″N 2°13′40″W		1063846	Upload Photo	Q26317117
38, Britannia Square	II	38, Britannia Square			22 May 1954	SO8455555727; 52°11′58″N 2°13′39″W		1063847	Upload Photo	Q26317118
Chester House	II	39, Britannia Square			22 May 1954	SO8456755736; 52°11′59″N 2°13′38″W		1063848	Upload Photo	Q26317119
40, Britannia Square	II	40, Britannia Square			22 May 1954	SO8458055744; 52°11′59″N 2°13′37″W		1063849	Upload Photo	Q26317120
41, Britannia Square	II	41, Britannia Square			22 May 1954	SO8459655753; 52°11′59″N 2°13′36″W		1063850	Upload Photo	Q26317121
No 42 and 43 and Attached Wall and Piers to No 42	II	42 and 43, Britannia Square			22 May 1954	SO8461655768; 52°12′00″N 2°13′35″W		1063851	Upload Photo	Q26317122
44, Britannia Square	II	44, Britannia Square			22 May 1954	SO8463555779; 52°12′00″N 2°13′34″W		1063852	Upload Photo	Q26317123
North Lodge	II	45, Britannia Square			22 May 1954	SO8464955788; 52°12′00″N 2°13′34″W		1063853	Upload Photo	Q26317124
Rothesay House and Rothesay Lodge with Attached Boundary Wall and Gate Piers	II	46 and 46a, Britannia Square			26 March 1975	SO8464655892; 52°12′04″N 2°13′34″W		1063854	Upload Photo	Q26317125
47 And 48 (Cumberland House), Britannia Square	II	47 and 48, Britannia Square			22 May 1954	SO8465755838; 52°12′02″N 2°13′33″W		1063855	Upload Photo	Q26317126
No 49 and Attached Boundary Wall to Rear	II	49, Britannia Square			22 May 1954	SO8469255780; 52°12′00″N 2°13′31″W		1063856	Upload Photo	Q26317127
No 50 and Attached Wall to Rear	II	50, Britannia Square			22 May 1954	SO8469755766; 52°12′00″N 2°13′31″W		1063857	Upload Photo	Q26317128
No 51 and Piers and Attached Wall to Rear	II	51, Britannia Square			22 May 1954	SO8470855734; 52°11′59″N 2°13′31″W		1063858	Upload Photo	Q26317129
52 And 52A, Britannia Square	II	52 and 52a, Britannia Square			22 May 1954	SO8471355716; 52°11′58″N 2°13′30″W		1063859	Upload Photo	Q26317130
St Oswald's and Attached Walls	II	53, Britannia Square			22 May 1954	SO8472355692; 52°11′57″N 2°13′30″W		1063860	Upload Photo	Q26317131
10, Bromwich Lane	II	10, Bromwich Lane			5 March 1985	SO8421254458; 52°11′17″N 2°13′56″W		1063891	Upload Photo	Q26317161
12, Bromwich Lane	II	12, Bromwich Lane			5 March 1985	SO8421554450; 52°11′17″N 2°13′56″W		1063832	Upload Photo	Q26317102
55 and 57, Bromwich Road	II	55 and 57, Bromwich Road			5 April 1971	SO8429554121; 52°11′06″N 2°13′52″W		1063790	Upload Photo	Q26317068
108 and 110, Bromwich Road	II	108 and 110, Bromwich Road			8 March 1974	SO8424453736; 52°10′54″N 2°13′55″W		1063791	Upload Photo	Q26317069
1, Bromyard Road	II	1, Bromyard Road			29 June 1982	SO8403854485; 52°11′18″N 2°14′06″W		1063792	Upload Photo	Q26317070
5-17, Bromyard Road	II	5-17, Bromyard Road			3 April 1989	SO8395354476; 52°11′18″N 2°14′10″W		1063793	Upload Photo	Q26317071
Cedar Court	II	28, Bromyard Road, WR2 5BT			22 May 1954	SO8390554534; 52°11′20″N 2°14′13″W		1063794	Upload Photo	Q26317072
1, Bull Ring	II	1, Bull Ring			8 March 1974	SO8418054509; 52°11′19″N 2°13′58″W		1063795	Upload Photo	Q26317073
3 and 5, Bull Ring	II	3 and 5, Bull Ring			8 March 1974	SO8417154509; 52°11′19″N 2°13′59″W		1063796	Upload Photo	Q26317074
29 and 29a, Chestnut Walk	II	29 and 29a, Chestnut Walk			8 March 1974	SO8493555830; 52°12′02″N 2°13′19″W		1063800	Upload Photo	Q26317078
War Memorial, Churchyard Of St Barnabas, Worcester	II	Church Road, WR3 8NX			2 September 2016	SO8594456347; 52°12′19″N 2°12′26″W		1437271	Upload Photo	Q66477800
Chest Tomb about 13 Metres to SE of Church of St John the Baptist	II	Claines Lane, Claines			23 March 1985	SO8516058862; 52°13′40″N 2°13′07″W		1063809	Upload Photo	Q26317086
Church of St John the Baptist	II*	Claines Lane, Claines			14 March 1969	SO8514358862; 52°13′40″N 2°13′08″W		1063810	Church of St John the Baptist More images	Q17548058
Claines War Memorial	II	Claines Lane, Claines, WR3 7RD			15 September 2016	SO8517558852; 52°13′40″N 2°13′06″W		1437487	Claines War Memorial More images	Q66477840
Dyson Perrins Memorial about 30 Metres to W of Church of St John the Baptist	II	Claines Lane, Claines			21 March 1985	SO8511058857; 52°13′40″N 2°13′10″W		1063811	Upload Photo	Q26317087
Mug House Inn	II	Claines Lane, Claines			14 March 1969	SO8510358811; 52°13′38″N 2°13′10″W		1063815	Mug House Inn More images	Q7752602
Pedestal Tomb about 37 Metres to West of the Church of St John the Baptist	II	Claines Lane, Claines			21 March 1985	SO8510758854; 52°13′40″N 2°13′10″W		1063812	Upload Photo	Q26317088
Taylor Memorial about 28 Metres to South of the Church of St John the Baptist	II	Claines Lane, Claines			21 March 1985	SO8512758823; 52°13′39″N 2°13′09″W		1063813	Upload Photo	Q26317089
Wakeman Memorial about 1 Metre to North-east of Church of St John the Baptist	II	Claines Lane, Claines			21 March 1985	SO8515458872; 52°13′40″N 2°13′08″W		1063814	Upload Photo	Q26317090
Church Farm Cottage	II	Cornmeadow Lane, Claines			21 March 1985	SO8499158736; 52°13′36″N 2°13′16″W		1389756	Upload Photo	Q26669184
Church House	II	Cornmeadow Lane, Claines			14 March 1969	SO8505858853; 52°13′40″N 2°13′13″W		1389757	Upload Photo	Q26669185
Fountain	II	Cripplegate Park			5 April 1971	SO8438754615; 52°11′22″N 2°13′47″W		1389758	Fountain More images	Q26669186
Barge Lock No 1 Adjacent to River Severn	II	Diglis Dock Basin			16 December 1987	SO8485753842; 52°10′57″N 2°13′22″W		1389765	Barge Lock No 1 Adjacent to River Severn More images	Q26669191
Barge Lock No 2	II	Diglis Dock Basin			16 December 1987	SO8494853903; 52°10′59″N 2°13′18″W		1389766	Barge Lock No 2 More images	Q26669192
Lock Cottage Adjacent to Barge Lock No 2	II	Diglis Dock Basin			16 December 1987	SO8495853885; 52°10′59″N 2°13′17″W		1389767	Lock Cottage Adjacent to Barge Lock No 2 More images	Q26669193
Lock Cottages	II	1, 2 and 3, Diglis Dock Road, Diglis Island			18 February 1999	SO8468353331; 52°10′41″N 2°13′31″W		1389768	Upload Photo	Q26669194
11-17, Diglis Road	II	11-17, Diglis Road			18 February 1999	SO8514854056; 52°11′04″N 2°13′07″W		1389770	Upload Photo	Q26669196
Stable Block of Former Perdiswell Hall and Attached Walls and Outbuilding	II	Droitwich Road			22 May 1954	SO8534557609; 52°12′59″N 2°12′57″W		1389774	Upload Photo	Q26669200
Octagonal Lodge	II	1, Droitwich Road			8 March 1974	SO8458956576; 52°12′26″N 2°13′37″W		1389771	Octagonal Lodge More images	Q26669197
Nos 1 and 2 and Attached Garden Walls and Railings	II	1 and 2, Field Terrace			19 August 1999	SO8515553965; 52°11′01″N 2°13′07″W		1389788	Upload Photo	Q26669214
Nos 3 and 4 and Attached Garden Walls and Railings	II	3 and 4, Field Terrace			19 August 1999	SO8514153954; 52°11′01″N 2°13′07″W		1389789	Upload Photo	Q26669215
5 To 7 Field Terrace And 8 (Little Hill) And Attached Garden Walls And Railings	II	5-7, Field Terrace, WR5 3BN			19 August 1999	SO8512853940; 52°11′01″N 2°13′08″W		1389790	Upload Photo	Q26669216
Park House and Attached Railings	II	10, Fort Royal Lane			15 May 1979	SO8564154329; 52°11′13″N 2°12′41″W		1389834	Upload Photo	Q26669258
11 And 11A Green Hill	II	11 and 11a, Green Hill, London Road			19 August 1999	SO8534054163; 52°11′08″N 2°12′57″W		1389868	Upload Photo	Q26669290
Nos 16 And 17, Green Hill	II	16 and 17, Green Hill, London Road, WR5 2AA			22 May 1954	SO8543554165; 52°11′08″N 2°12′52″W		1389871	Upload Photo	Q26669293
1 and 2, Green Hill Bath Road	II	1 and 2, Green Hill Bath Road, WR5 2AT			19 August 1999	SO8530254208; 52°11′09″N 2°12′59″W		1389863	Upload Photo	Q26669284
3, 4 and 5, Green Hill Bath Road	II	3, 4 and 5, Green Hill Bath Road, WR5 2AT			19 August 1999	SO8529354199; 52°11′09″N 2°13′00″W		1389864	Upload Photo	Q26669285
6, Green Hill Bath Road	II	6, Green Hill Bath Road, WR5 2AT			19 August 1999	SO8528954191; 52°11′09″N 2°13′00″W		1389865	Upload Photo	Q26688318
2-5 Green Hill London Road And Attached Railings To 2, 4 And 5	II	2-5, Green Hill London Road, WR5 2AA			22 May 1954	SO8541954182; 52°11′08″N 2°12′53″W		1389866	Upload Photo	Q26669287
6-10 And Attached Railings To 6, 7, 8 And 9 Green Hill London Road	II	6-10, Green Hill London Road, WR5 2AA			22 May 1954	SO8540254151; 52°11′07″N 2°12′54″W		1389867	Upload Photo	Q26669289
Abbeyfield	II	12, Green Hill London Road, WR5 2AA			22 May 1954	SO8538754131; 52°11′07″N 2°12′55″W		1389869	Upload Photo	Q26669291
14 and 15, Green Hill London Road	II	14 and 15, Green Hill London Road, WR5 2AA			8 March 1974	SO8542054144; 52°11′07″N 2°12′53″W		1389870	Upload Photo	Q26669292
Hallow Bank	II	Hallow Road			5 April 1971	SO8348456698; 52°12′30″N 2°14′35″W		1389872	Upload Photo	Q26669294
The Grove	II	Harrow Croft			8 March 1974	SO8241954273; 52°11′11″N 2°15′31″W		1389873	Upload Photo	Q26669295
Church of St Clement Including Gates and Railings to the West	II	Henwick Road			19 August 1999	SO8411054741; 52°11′26″N 2°14′02″W		1389888	Church of St Clement Including Gates and Railings to the West More images	Q26669311
Coach House and Stable at the Cedars	II	Henwick Road			1 June 1989	SO8363756065; 52°12′09″N 2°14′27″W		1389887	Upload Photo	Q26669310
St Clement'S War Memorial	II	Henwick Road, WR2 5NP			4 May 2017	SO8409154736; 52°11′26″N 2°14′03″W		1445132	St Clement'S War Memorial More images	Q66478692
Former Royal Albert Orphanage	II	12, Henwick Road, WR2 5NS			18 November 1991	SO8397055006; 52°11′35″N 2°14′09″W		1389889	Upload Photo	Q26669312
St Clements House	II	28 and 28a, Henwick Road			5 April 1971	SO8409654709; 52°11′25″N 2°14′03″W		1389874	Upload Photo	Q26669296
30, Henwick Road	II	30, Henwick Road			8 March 1974	SO8409554719; 52°11′26″N 2°14′03″W		1389875	Upload Photo	Q26669298
The Manor House	II	34, Henwick Road			5 April 1971	SO8408154822; 52°11′29″N 2°14′03″W		1389876	Upload Photo	Q26669299
42, Henwick Road	II	42, Henwick Road			8 March 1974	SO8407254855; 52°11′30″N 2°14′04″W		1389877	Upload Photo	Q26669300
44, Henwick Road	II	44, Henwick Road			8 March 1974	SO8407054863; 52°11′30″N 2°14′04″W		1389878	Upload Photo	Q26669301
46, Henwick Road	II	46, Henwick Road			8 March 1974	SO8407254869; 52°11′31″N 2°14′04″W		1389879	Upload Photo	Q26669302
48 and 50, Henwick Road	II	48 and 50, Henwick Road			8 March 1974	SO8406854874; 52°11′31″N 2°14′04″W		1389880	Upload Photo	Q26669303
184-190, Henwick Road	II	184-190, Henwick Road			8 March 1974	SO8377955753; 52°11′59″N 2°14′20″W		1389881	Upload Photo	Q26669304
The Wheatsheaf Inn	II	192 and 194, Henwick Road			8 March 1974	SO8377255768; 52°12′00″N 2°14′20″W		1389882	The Wheatsheaf Inn More images	Q26669305
196-202, Henwick Road	II	196-202, Henwick Road			8 March 1974	SO8376355783; 52°12′00″N 2°14′20″W		1389883	Upload Photo	Q26669306
214, Henwick Road	II	214, Henwick Road			8 March 1974	SO8371755879; 52°12′03″N 2°14′23″W		1389884	Upload Photo	Q26669307
218, Henwick Road	II	218, Henwick Road			8 March 1974	SO8368655931; 52°12′05″N 2°14′24″W		1389885	Upload Photo	Q26669308
The Cedars	II	224, Henwick Road			1 June 1989	SO8366056063; 52°12′09″N 2°14′26″W		1389886	Upload Photo	Q26669309
Coach House to Rose Place about 23 Metres to North West	II	Hindlip Lane, Claines			21 March 1985	SO8592958432; 52°13′26″N 2°12′27″W		1389927	Upload Photo	Q26669350
Granary and Animal Pen about 28 Metres East of Moat End Farmhouse	II	Hindlip Lane, Claines			21 March 1985	SO8597958260; 52°13′21″N 2°12′24″W		1389923	Upload Photo	Q26669347
Holy Claines Farmhouse	II	Hindlip Lane, Claines			14 March 1969	SO8645258295; 52°13′22″N 2°11′59″W		1389924	Upload Photo	Q26669348
Outbuilding about 11 Metres South of Holy Claines Farmhouse	II	Hindlip Lane, Claines			14 March 1969	SO8645558275; 52°13′21″N 2°11′59″W		1389925	Upload Photo	Q26669349
Rose Place	II*	Hindlip Lane, Claines			21 March 1985	SO8593758404; 52°13′25″N 2°12′26″W		1389926	Rose Place More images	Q17548166
Holywell House	II	Holywell Hill			22 May 1954	SO8396655369; 52°11′47″N 2°14′10″W		1389928	Upload Photo	Q26669351
Electricity Junction Box, Hylton Road	II	Hylton Road, WR2 5JN			31 January 2025	SO8457554756; 52°11′27″N 2°13′37″W		1492092	Upload Photo	Q136386100
Nos 1 and 2 and Attached Wall	II	1 and 2, Lansdowne Crescent			5 April 1971	SO8550755695; 52°11′57″N 2°12′48″W		1389931	Upload Photo	Q26669352
3 and 4, Lansdowne Crescent	II	3 and 4, Lansdowne Crescent			5 April 1971	SO8549555714; 52°11′58″N 2°12′49″W		1389932	Upload Photo	Q26669353
No 5 and Attached Gazebo	II	5, Lansdowne Crescent			5 April 1971	SO8548055730; 52°11′59″N 2°12′50″W		1389933	Upload Photo	Q26669354
6, Lansdowne Crescent	II	6, Lansdowne Crescent			5 April 1971	SO8546555754; 52°11′59″N 2°12′51″W		1389934	Upload Photo	Q26669355
7, 8, 8a and 9, Lansdowne Crescent	II	7, 8, 8a and 9, Lansdowne Crescent			5 April 1971	SO8545455776; 52°12′00″N 2°12′51″W		1389935	Upload Photo	Q26669356
10, Lansdowne Crescent	II	10, Lansdowne Crescent			5 April 1971	SO8543955805; 52°12′01″N 2°12′52″W		1389936	Upload Photo	Q26669357
11, Lansdowne Crescent	II	11, Lansdowne Crescent			5 April 1971	SO8543555827; 52°12′02″N 2°12′52″W		1389937	Upload Photo	Q26669358
12, Lansdowne Crescent	II	12, Lansdowne Crescent			5 April 1971	SO8542355847; 52°12′02″N 2°12′53″W		1389938	Upload Photo	Q26669359
14, Lansdowne Crescent	II	14, Lansdowne Crescent			5 April 1971	SO8541055879; 52°12′03″N 2°12′54″W		1389939	Upload Photo	Q26669360
15, Lansdowne Crescent	II	15, Lansdowne Crescent			5 April 1971	SO8540655891; 52°12′04″N 2°12′54″W		1389940	Upload Photo	Q26669361
16, Lansdowne Crescent	II	16, Lansdowne Crescent			19 August 1999	SO8539955906; 52°12′04″N 2°12′54″W		1389941	Upload Photo	Q26669362
The Homestead	II	17, Lansdowne Crescent			22 May 1954	SO8544355956; 52°12′06″N 2°12′52″W		1389942	Upload Photo	Q26669363
Bishops House	II	18, Lansdowne Crescent			22 May 1954	SO8543155985; 52°12′07″N 2°12′53″W		1389943	Upload Photo	Q26669364
Nos 38 and 40 with Attached Boundary Walls and Piers and Gates and Railings to No 38	II	38 and 40, Lark Hill			22 May 1954	SO8636554188; 52°11′09″N 2°12′03″W		1389944	Upload Photo	Q26669366
Dorset House	II	42, Lark Hill			22 May 1954	SO8637354170; 52°11′08″N 2°12′03″W		1389945	Upload Photo	Q26669367
44 and 46, Lark Hill	II	44 and 46, Lark Hill			22 May 1954	SO8637754148; 52°11′07″N 2°12′02″W		1389946	Upload Photo	Q26669368
48 and 50, Lark Hill	II	48 and 50, Lark Hill			22 May 1954	SO8638354128; 52°11′07″N 2°12′02″W		1389947	Upload Photo	Q26669369
Woodside	II	Lark Hill Road			22 May 1954	SO8634554246; 52°11′11″N 2°12′04″W		1389948	Upload Photo	Q26669370
Electricity Junction Box, Lavender Road	II	Lavender Road, Gheluvelt Park, WR3 7AA			31 January 2025	SO8455856574; 52°12′26″N 2°13′39″W		1491924	Upload Photo	Q136386097
War Memorial, Lichfield Avenue, Ronkswood	II	Lichfield Avenue, WR5 1NW			18 October 2016	SO8702654927; 52°11′33″N 2°11′28″W		1438453	War Memorial, Lichfield Avenue, Ronkswood More images	Q66477975
Heron Lodge	II	London Road			22 May 1954	SO8640054071; 52°11′05″N 2°12′01″W		1389968	Upload Photo	Q26669391
1 and 3, London Road	II	1 and 3, London Road			8 March 1974	SO8533754319; 52°11′13″N 2°12′57″W		1389949	Upload Photo	Q26669371
4 and 6, London Road	II	4 and 6, London Road			18 August 1999	SO8532054301; 52°11′12″N 2°12′58″W		1389950	Upload Photo	Q26669372
21, London Road, With Attached Railings And Gate	II	21, London Road, WR5 2DJ			8 March 1974	SO8538254270; 52°11′11″N 2°12′55″W		1389951	Upload Photo	Q26669373
57, London Road	II	57, London Road, WR5 2DU			18 August 1999	SO8551154232; 52°11′10″N 2°12′48″W		1389952	Upload Photo	Q26669374
63, London Road	II	63, London Road, WR5 2DU			8 March 1974	SO8553054222; 52°11′10″N 2°12′47″W		1389953	Upload Photo	Q26669375
64, London Road	II	64, London Road			5 April 1971	SO8559654164; 52°11′08″N 2°12′44″W		1389954	Upload Photo	Q26669376
65, London Road	II	65, London Road, WR5 2DU			8 March 1974	SO8553554221; 52°11′10″N 2°12′47″W		1389955	Upload Photo	Q26669377
66, London Road	II	66, London Road			5 April 1971	SO8560354164; 52°11′08″N 2°12′43″W		1389956	Upload Photo	Q26669378
67, London Road	II	67, London Road, WR5 2DU			8 March 1974	SO8554254216; 52°11′10″N 2°12′46″W		1389957	Upload Photo	Q26669379
68, London Road	II	68, London Road			5 April 1971	SO8560854160; 52°11′08″N 2°12′43″W		1389958	68, London Road More images	Q26669380
70, London Road	II	70, London Road			5 April 1971	SO8561654156; 52°11′08″N 2°12′43″W		1389959	70, London Road More images	Q26669381
72, London Road (See Details For Further Address Information)	II	72 and 74, London Road			8 March 1974	SO8562354158; 52°11′08″N 2°12′42″W		1389960	72, London Road (See Details For Further Address Information) More images	Q26669382
Rose House	II	73, London Road, WR5 2DU			8 March 1974	SO8560554203; 52°11′09″N 2°12′43″W		1389961	Upload Photo	Q26669383
74, London Road	II	74, London Road			8 March 1974	SO8563054156; 52°11′08″N 2°12′42″W		1389962	Upload Photo	Q26669384
75, London Road	II	75, London Road, WR5 2DU			5 April 1971	SO8561654202; 52°11′09″N 2°12′43″W		1389963	Upload Photo	Q26669386
79-87, London Road	II	79-87, London Road, WR5 2DZ			22 May 1954	SO8565554210; 52°11′09″N 2°12′40″W		1389964	Upload Photo	Q26669387
Rose Lawn	II	89, London Road, WR5 2DZ			5 April 1971	SO8570654222; 52°11′10″N 2°12′38″W		1389965	Upload Photo	Q26669388
South Hayes	II	101, London Road, WR5 2DZ			22 May 1954	SO8578054226; 52°11′10″N 2°12′34″W		1389966	Upload Photo	Q26669389
163, London Road	II	163, London Road			5 May 1976	SO8640353910; 52°11′00″N 2°12′01″W		1389967	Upload Photo	Q26669390
1, Loves Grove	II	1, Loves Grove			8 March 1974	SO8470355462; 52°11′50″N 2°13′31″W		1389969	Upload Photo	Q26669392
2 and 3, Loves Grove	II	2 and 3, Loves Grove			8 March 1974	SO8470555476; 52°11′50″N 2°13′31″W		1389970	Upload Photo	Q26669393
6 and 7, Loves Grove	II	6 and 7, Loves Grove			18 August 1999	SO8471155500; 52°11′51″N 2°13′30″W		1389971	Upload Photo	Q26669394
Bennetts Farmhouse with Attached Outbuildings and Barn to North Side	II	Malvern Road, Lower Wick			8 March 1974	SO8388252687; 52°10′20″N 2°14′14″W		1389992	Upload Photo	Q26669415
Farm Building (incorporating St Cuthbert's Chapel) East of Bennett's Farmhouse (not Included)	II	Malvern Road, Lower Wick			22 May 1954	SO8393552690; 52°10′20″N 2°14′11″W		1389993	Upload Photo	Q26669416
Lyttleton House	II	Malvern Road, Lower Wick			22 May 1954	SO8410452745; 52°10′22″N 2°14′02″W		1389994	Upload Photo	Q26669417
Pitmaston House	II	Malvern Road			5 April 1971	SO8387953849; 52°10′58″N 2°14′14″W		1389989	Upload Photo	Q26669412
Powick New Bridge	II	Malvern Road, A449			9 February 1988	SO8360652415; 52°10′11″N 2°14′28″W		1166981	Powick New Bridge More images	Q26460444
Walls and Piers and Gates and Gate Lodge to Pitmaston House and Pitmaston Park	II	Malvern Road			12 June 2001	SO8391453749; 52°10′54″N 2°14′12″W		1389990	Upload Photo	Q26669413
1 Malvern Road	II	1, Malvern Road, WR2 4LE			5 April 1971	SO8399454286; 52°11′12″N 2°14′08″W		1389985	Upload Photo	Q26669408
Malvern House (no 5) and Lynton House (no 7)	II	5 and 7, Malvern Road			5 April 1971	SO8398554255; 52°11′11″N 2°14′08″W		1389986	Upload Photo	Q26669409
Ivy House	II	199, Malvern Road			22 May 1954	SO8398453241; 52°10′38″N 2°14′08″W		1389987	Upload Photo	Q26669410
201, Malvern Road	II	201, Malvern Road			18 August 1999	SO8397753231; 52°10′38″N 2°14′09″W		1389988	Upload Photo	Q26669411
Gardener'S Cottage, Battenhall Mount	II	Mount Battenhall, Battenhall Avenue, WR5 2HP			25 March 2015	SO8611353541; 52°10′48″N 2°12′16″W		1423919	Upload Photo	Q26677061
Barbourne Works	II	Northwick Avenue			12 June 2001	SO8438756960; 52°12′38″N 2°13′48″W		1390026	Upload Photo	Q26669448
Nos 1 And 3, April Cottage (No 1) And Attached Garden Wall To Rear	II	1 and 3, Northwick Road			8 March 1974	SO8455856943; 52°12′38″N 2°13′39″W		1390027	Upload Photo	Q26669449
Northwick Grange	II	19, Old Northwick Lane			22 May 1954	SO8405657925; 52°13′09″N 2°14′05″W		1390028	Upload Photo	Q26669450
Powick Mills	II*	Old Road, Lower Wick			7 March 1989	SO8350752542; 52°10′15″N 2°14′33″W		1390029	Powick Mills More images	Q17548198
Powick Old Bridge	I	Old Road, Lower Wick			22 May 1954	SO8351252471; 52°10′13″N 2°14′33″W		1390030	Powick Old Bridge More images	Q17530390
Southwick Lodge	II	Old Road, Lower Wick			18 August 1999	SO8365152679; 52°10′20″N 2°14′26″W		1390031	Upload Photo	Q26669451
Teme Court	II	Old Road, Lower Wick			8 March 1974	SO8357052653; 52°10′19″N 2°14′30″W		1390032	Upload Photo	Q26669452
Northwick Cinema	II	Ombersley Road			31 January 1984	SO8465557287; 52°12′49″N 2°13′34″W		1390034	Northwick Cinema More images	Q26669454
Barbourne Grange	II	59, Ombersley Road			5 April 1971	SO8458256903; 52°12′36″N 2°13′37″W		1390033	Upload Photo	Q26669453
The Church Of St Martin	II	Parish Office, London Road, WR5 2ED			6 January 2014	SO8599054148; 52°11′07″N 2°12′23″W		1417579	The Church Of St Martin More images	Q26676587
Nos 31 and 33 and Attached Railings and Gates	II	31 and 33, Park Street			18 August 1999	SO8544054535; 52°11′20″N 2°12′52″W		1390035	Upload Photo	Q26669455
North Gate Pier, Quadrant Wall, Railings And Pier At Entrance To Perdiswell Park	II	Quadrant Wall, Railings And Pier At Entrance To Perdiswell Park, Droitwich Road, Perdiswell Park			22 May 1954	SO8502457449; 52°12′54″N 2°13′14″W		1389772	Upload Photo	Q26669198
South Gatepier, Quadrant Wall, Railings And Pier At Entrance To Perdiswell Park	II	Quadrant Wall, Railings And Pier At Entrance To Perdiswell Park, Droitwich Road			22 May 1954	SO8501157431; 52°12′54″N 2°13′15″W		1389773	Upload Photo	Q26669199
1, Rainbow Hill Terrace	II	1, Rainbow Hill Terrace			5 April 1971	SO8562255691; 52°11′57″N 2°12′42″W		1390044	Upload Photo	Q26669464
2, Rainbow Hill Terrace	II	2, Rainbow Hill Terrace			5 April 1971	SO8562955689; 52°11′57″N 2°12′42″W		1390045	Upload Photo	Q26669465
3, Rainbow Hill Terrace	II	3, Rainbow Hill Terrace			5 April 1971	SO8563555687; 52°11′57″N 2°12′42″W		1390046	Upload Photo	Q26669466
4 and 5, Rainbow Hill Terrace	II	4 and 5, Rainbow Hill Terrace			5 April 1971	SO8564555685; 52°11′57″N 2°12′41″W		1390047	Upload Photo	Q26669467
6 and 7, Rainbow Hill Terrace	II	6 and 7, Rainbow Hill Terrace			5 April 1971	SO8566155683; 52°11′57″N 2°12′40″W		1390048	Upload Photo	Q26669468
8, 9 and 9a, Rainbow Hill Terrace	II	8, 9 and 9a, Rainbow Hill Terrace			5 April 1971	SO8567855679; 52°11′57″N 2°12′39″W		1390049	Upload Photo	Q26669469
10, Rainbow Hill Terrace	II	10, Rainbow Hill Terrace			5 April 1971	SO8569155676; 52°11′57″N 2°12′39″W		1390073	Upload Photo	Q26669493
Workshops On Diglis Island, River Severn	II	River Severn, Diglis Dock Road			18 February 1999	SO8468353369; 52°10′42″N 2°13′32″W		1389769	Upload Photo	Q26669195
Rose Bank House	II	Rose Bank			18 August 1999	SO8577554267; 52°11′11″N 2°12′34″W		1390074	Upload Photo	Q26669494
Rose Hill House	II	Rose Hill			15 May 1979	SO8568554358; 52°11′14″N 2°12′39″W		1390076	Upload Photo	Q26669496
1 and 2, Rose Hill	II	1 and 2, Rose Hill			5 April 1971	SO8562254197; 52°11′09″N 2°12′42″W		1390075	Upload Photo	Q26669495
1-3, Rose Terrace	II	1-3, Rose Terrace			18 August 1999	SO8559554393; 52°11′15″N 2°12′44″W		1390077	Upload Photo	Q26669497
Boughton Villa	II	2, School Road			5 April 1971	SO8367654228; 52°11′10″N 2°14′25″W		1390146	Upload Photo	Q26669563
The Commandery	I	Sidbury			22 May 1954	SO8527554428; 52°11′16″N 2°13′01″W		1390176	The Commandery More images	Q7726974
K8 Telephone Kiosk at Worcester Shrub Hill Railway Station	II	Shrub Hill			8 July 2009	SO8578655192; 52°11′41″N 2°12′34″W		1393363	K8 Telephone Kiosk at Worcester Shrub Hill Railway Station More images	Q26672533
Shrub Hill Railway Station	II	Shrub Hill, WR4 9EJ			5 April 1971	SO8577855180; 52°11′41″N 2°12′34″W		1390156	Shrub Hill Railway Station More images	Q1974749
Shrub Hill Station: Waiting Room to East Platform	II*	Shrub Hill			5 April 1971	SO8583055128; 52°11′39″N 2°12′31″W		1390157	Shrub Hill Station: Waiting Room to East Platform More images	Q17548223
Worcester Engine Works	II	11-15, Shrub Hill Road			30 October 1980	SO8555455275; 52°11′44″N 2°12′46″W		1390158	Upload Photo	Q26669572
87 and 89, Sidbury	II	87 and 89, Sidbury			8 March 1974	SO8526454390; 52°11′15″N 2°13′01″W		1390167	Upload Photo	Q26669581
91-99, Sidbury	II	91-99, Sidbury			5 April 1971	SO8527754382; 52°11′15″N 2°13′00″W		1390168	Upload Photo	Q26669582
101, 103 and 105, Sidbury	II	101, 103 and 105, Sidbury			5 April 1971	SO8529254373; 52°11′15″N 2°13′00″W		1390169	Upload Photo	Q26669583
107, Sidbury	II	107, Sidbury			5 April 1971	SO8529754366; 52°11′14″N 2°12′59″W		1390170	Upload Photo	Q26669584
Red Lion Inn	II	109, Sidbury			5 April 1971	SO8530654361; 52°11′14″N 2°12′59″W		1390171	Red Lion Inn	Q26669585
111 and 113, Sidbury	II	111 and 113, Sidbury			8 March 1974	SO8531754348; 52°11′14″N 2°12′58″W		1390172	Upload Photo	Q26669586
115, Sidbury	II	115, Sidbury, WR5 2DH			18 August 1999	SO8532354341; 52°11′14″N 2°12′58″W		1390173	115, Sidbury More images	Q26669587
117, Sidbury	II	117, Sidbury			18 August 1999	SO8532654336; 52°11′13″N 2°12′58″W		1390174	Upload Photo	Q26669588
Loch Ryan Hotel	II	119, Sidbury			22 May 1954	SO8533154330; 52°11′13″N 2°12′58″W		1390175	Upload Photo	Q26669589
Church of St George	II	St Georges Square			5 April 1971	SO8476456215; 52°12′14″N 2°13′28″W		1390096	Church of St George More images	Q26669516
Gateway to Church of St George	II	St Georges Square			5 April 1971	SO8473256208; 52°12′14″N 2°13′29″W		1390097	Gateway to Church of St George More images	Q26669517
K6 Telephone Kiosk	II	St Georges Square			14 June 1988	SO8462156189; 52°12′13″N 2°13′35″W		1390098	Upload Photo	Q26688325
1 and 2, St Georges Square	II	1 and 2, St Georges Square			19 August 1999	SO8463756137; 52°12′12″N 2°13′34″W		1390078	Upload Photo	Q26669498
3, St Georges Square	II	3, St Georges Square			22 May 1954	SO8464856141; 52°12′12″N 2°13′34″W		1390079	Upload Photo	Q26669499
4 and 5, St Georges Square	II	4 and 5, St Georges Square			22 May 1954	SO8465956143; 52°12′12″N 2°13′33″W		1390080	Upload Photo	Q26669500
6, St Georges Square	II	6, St Georges Square			22 May 1954	SO8467056146; 52°12′12″N 2°13′33″W		1390081	Upload Photo	Q26669501
7 and 8, St Georges Square	II	7 and 8, St Georges Square			22 May 1954	SO8468056149; 52°12′12″N 2°13′32″W		1390082	Upload Photo	Q26669502
9 and 10, St Georges Square	II	9 and 10, St Georges Square			22 May 1954	SO8469556154; 52°12′12″N 2°13′31″W		1390083	Upload Photo	Q26669503
11, St Georges Square	II	11, St Georges Square			22 May 1954	SO8470656158; 52°12′12″N 2°13′31″W		1390084	Upload Photo	Q26669504
12 and 13, St Georges Square	II	12 and 13, St Georges Square			22 May 1954	SO8471756160; 52°12′12″N 2°13′30″W		1390085	Upload Photo	Q26669505
14, St Georges Square	II	14, St Georges Square			22 May 1954	SO8472856163; 52°12′13″N 2°13′30″W		1390086	Upload Photo	Q26669506
15 and 16, St Georges Square	II	15 and 16, St Georges Square			22 May 1954	SO8474256167; 52°12′13″N 2°13′29″W		1390087	Upload Photo	Q26669507
17, St Georges Square	II	17, St Georges Square			22 May 1954	SO8475556178; 52°12′13″N 2°13′28″W		1390088	Upload Photo	Q26669508
Annesley	II	18, St Georges Square			22 May 1954	SO8476156186; 52°12′13″N 2°13′28″W		1390089	Upload Photo	Q26669509
21 and 22, St Georges Square	II	21 and 22, St Georges Square			22 May 1954	SO8470256241; 52°12′15″N 2°13′31″W		1390090	Upload Photo	Q26669510
The Vicarage	II	23, St Georges Square			22 May 1954	SO8468856236; 52°12′15″N 2°13′32″W		1390091	Upload Photo	Q26669511
Nos 24 and 25 and Attached Gate	II	24 and 25, St Georges Square			22 May 1954	SO8467956234; 52°12′15″N 2°13′32″W		1390092	Upload Photo	Q26669512
26 and 27, St Georges Square	II	26 and 27, St Georges Square			22 May 1954	SO8466556230; 52°12′15″N 2°13′33″W		1390093	Upload Photo	Q26669513
28 and 29, St Georges Square	II	28 and 29, St Georges Square			22 May 1954	SO8464356224; 52°12′14″N 2°13′34″W		1390094	Upload Photo	Q26669514
30 and 31, St Georges Square	II	30 and 31, St Georges Square			22 May 1954	SO8461856219; 52°12′14″N 2°13′35″W		1390095	Upload Photo	Q26669515
1, St Johns	II	1, St Johns, WR2 5AE			20 September 1973	SO8414254509; 52°11′19″N 2°14′00″W		1390099	Upload Photo	Q26669519
3 and 3a, St Johns	II	3 and 3a, St Johns, WR2 5AE			8 March 1974	SO8413254504; 52°11′19″N 2°14′01″W		1390100	Upload Photo	Q26669520
5, St Johns	II	5, St Johns, WR2 5AE			8 March 1974	SO8412254494; 52°11′18″N 2°14′01″W		1390101	Upload Photo	Q26669521
6, St Johns	II	6, St Johns, WR2 5AH			10 May 1978	SO8413254530; 52°11′20″N 2°14′01″W		1390102	Upload Photo	Q26669522
7, St Johns	II	7, St Johns, WR2 5AE			5 April 1971	SO8411554493; 52°11′18″N 2°14′02″W		1390103	Upload Photo	Q26669523
14 and 16, St Johns	II	14 and 16, St Johns, WR2 5AH			8 March 1974	SO8410154515; 52°11′19″N 2°14′02″W		1390104	Upload Photo	Q26669524
18, St Johns	II	18, St Johns, WR2 5AH			8 March 1974	SO8409354512; 52°11′19″N 2°14′03″W		1390105	Upload Photo	Q26669525
20, St Johns	II	20, St Johns, WR2 5AH			8 March 1974	SO8408754511; 52°11′19″N 2°14′03″W		1390106	Upload Photo	Q26669526
23, St Johns	II	23, St Johns, WR2 5AE			5 March 1974	SO8407654463; 52°11′17″N 2°14′04″W		1390107	Upload Photo	Q26669527
24, St Johns (Formerly Angel Inn)	II	24, St Johns, (formerly Angel Inn), WR2 5AH			8 March 1974	SO8407454509; 52°11′19″N 2°14′04″W		1390108	Upload Photo	Q26669528
25, St Johns	II	25, St Johns, WR2 5AG			5 April 1971	SO8406854443; 52°11′17″N 2°14′04″W		1390109	Upload Photo	Q26669529
27, St Johns	II	27, St Johns, WR2 5AG			5 April 1971	SO8405754448; 52°11′17″N 2°14′05″W		1390110	Upload Photo	Q26669530
29, St Johns	II	29, St Johns, WR2 5AG			5 April 1971	SO8405554440; 52°11′17″N 2°14′05″W		1390111	Upload Photo	Q26669531
37, 39, 41 and 41a, St Johns	II	37, 39, 41 and 41a, St Johns, WR2 5AG			8 March 1974	SO8404354410; 52°11′16″N 2°14′05″W		1390113	Upload Photo	Q26669533
40, St Johns	II	40, St Johns, WR2 5AJ			8 March 1974	SO8402454417; 52°11′16″N 2°14′06″W		1390114	Upload Photo	Q26669534
43-49, St Johns	II	43-49, St Johns, WR2 5AG			5 April 1971	SO8403354394; 52°11′15″N 2°14′06″W		1390115	Upload Photo	Q26669535
59 and 61, St Johns	II	59 and 61, St Johns, WR2 5AG			8 March 1974	SO8402554365; 52°11′14″N 2°14′06″W		1390116	Upload Photo	Q26669536
63, St Johns	II	63, St Johns, WR2 5AG			8 March 1974	SO8402354357; 52°11′14″N 2°14′06″W		1390117	Upload Photo	Q26669537
65 and 67, St Johns	II	65 and 67, St Johns, WR2 5AG			8 March 1974	SO8401454354; 52°11′14″N 2°14′07″W		1390118	Upload Photo	Q26669538
69, St Johns	II	69, St Johns, WR2 5AG			12 December 1975	SO8401154344; 52°11′14″N 2°14′07″W		1390119	Upload Photo	Q26669539
Church of St John	II*	St John's			22 May 1954	SO8401654466; 52°11′18″N 2°14′07″W		1390120	Church of St John More images	Q17548203
No 33 and 35 (the Bell)	II	33 and 35, St John's			5 April 1971	SO8404954423; 52°11′16″N 2°14′05″W		1390112	Upload Photo	Q26669532
Church of St Stephen	II	St Stephen's Street			18 February 1999	SO8469056870; 52°12′35″N 2°13′32″W		1390126	Church of St Stephen More images	Q26669545
War Memorial In The Churchyard Of St Stephen'S Church	II	St. Stephen's Street, WR3 7HS			2 August 2017	SO8471256861; 52°12′35″N 2°13′31″W		1448607	Upload Photo	Q66478903
Severn Lodge	II	1, Stephenson Terrace			8 March 1974	SO8446055765; 52°12′00″N 2°13′44″W		1390181	Upload Photo	Q26669594
4-10, The Moors	II	4-10, The Moors			5 April 1971	SO8452555465; 52°11′50″N 2°13′40″W		1390201	Upload Photo	Q26669609
Midland Railway Goods Shed And Associated Weighbridge	II	The Railway Yard, Midland Road, WR5 1DS			20 October 2022	SO8587254841; 52°11′30″N 2°12′29″W		1483512	Upload Photo	Q122213861
Lansdowne Lodge And Merrimans Lodge	II	Till Street			8 March 1974	SO8519256045; 52°12′09″N 2°13′05″W		1390237	Upload Photo	Q26669646
Worcester Royal Grammar School Eld Hall, Main Building, Attached Gates And Gate Piers	II	Upper Tything			19 January 1989	SO8473855833; 52°12′02″N 2°13′29″W		1390244	Upload Photo	Q26669651
Gheluvelt Park Arch, Gates and Railings	II	52, Tybridge Street			22 May 1954	SO8430954737; 52°11′26″N 2°13′51″W		1390239	Upload Photo	Q26669647
Gheluvelt Park	II	Upper Tything			19 January 1989	SO8473555891; 52°12′04″N 2°13′29″W		1390243	Upload Photo	Q26669650
Gheluvelt Park Band Stand, Worcester	II	Upper Tything			19 January 1989	SO8477055876; 52°12′03″N 2°13′27″W		1390241	Upload Photo	Q26669648
Nos. 1-12 Gheluvelt Park, Worcester	II*	Upper Tything			22 May 1954	SO8480855701; 52°11′58″N 2°13′25″W		1390240	Nos. 1-12 Gheluvelt Park, Worcester More images	Q17548248
War Memorial in the Churchyard of the Church of St Martin, Worcester	II	Upper Tything			22 May 1954	SO8474855783; 52°12′00″N 2°13′28″W		1390242	Upload Photo	Q26669649
War memorial located to the rear of the Roman Catholic Church of St George	II*	Upper Tything			22 May 1954	SO8478655806; 52°12′01″N 2°13′26″W		1390245	Upload Photo	Q17548254
Electricity Junction Box, Beckett Drive	II	7-12, Victoria Place, London Road			20 November 1975	SO8557354237; 52°11′10″N 2°12′45″W		1390246	Upload Photo	Q26669652
13-19, Victoria Place	II	13-19, Victoria Place, London Road			4 June 1975	SO8560154259; 52°11′11″N 2°12′43″W		1390247	Upload Photo	Q26669653
Red Hill House	II	5, Yew Tree Close, London Road			11 September 1979	SO8664453802; 52°10′56″N 2°11′48″W		1390248	Upload Photo	Q26669654
Battenhall Mount (former St Mary's Convent School)	II*				18 February 1999	SO8599953654; 52°10′51″N 2°12′22″W		1359585	Upload Photo	Q26263523
Gheluvelt Park	II				28 April 2015	SO8442356549; 52°12′25″N 2°13′46″W		1425120	Gheluvelt Park More images	Q15221612
Gheluvelt Park Arch, Gates and Railings	II				28 April 2015	SO8456656551; 52°12′25″N 2°13′38″W		1421216	Gheluvelt Park Arch, Gates and Railings More images	Q26676847
Gheluvelt Park Band Stand	II				28 April 2015	SO8443356529; 52°12′24″N 2°13′45″W		1425038	Gheluvelt Park Band Stand More images	Q26677150
Nos. 1-12 Gheluvelt Park	II				28 April 2015	SO8453156553; 52°12′25″N 2°13′40″W		1424082	Upload Photo	Q26677075
War Memorial in the Churchyard of the Church of St Martin	II				6 March 2015	SO8596554141; 52°11′07″N 2°12′24″W		1425093	War Memorial in the Churchyard of the Church of St Martin More images	Q26677158

== See also ==
- Grade I listed buildings in Worcestershire
- Grade II* listed buildings in Worcestershire

== Sources ==
- Brooks, Alan; Pevsner, Nikolaus (2007), Worcestershire, The Buildings of England, New Haven and London: Yale University Press, ISBN 978-0-300-11298-6
