= Grade II* listed buildings in Worcestershire =

Worcestershire shown within England

The county of Worcestershire is divided into six districts. The districts of Worcestershire are Worcester, Malvern Hills, Wyre Forest, Bromsgrove, Redditch, and Wychavon.

As there are 322 Grade I listed buildings in the county they have been split into separate lists for each district.

- Grade II* listed buildings in Worcester
- Grade II* listed buildings in Malvern Hills (district)
- Grade II* listed buildings in Wyre Forest (district)
- Grade II* listed buildings in Bromsgrove (district)
- Grade II* listed buildings in Redditch
- Grade II* listed buildings in Wychavon

== See also ==
- Grade I listed buildings in Worcestershire
