= List of shopping centres in the United Kingdom =

This is a list of shopping centres both past and present in the United Kingdom. This list does not include retail parks or shopping parades.

== England ==
The list is split by region.

=== East of England ===
- Basildon
  - Eastgate Shopping Centre
- Bishop's Stortford
  - Jackson Square Shopping Centre
- Braintree
  - Braintree Village (formerly Braintree Freeport)
  - George Yard Shopping Centre
- Burnham Deepdale
  - Dalegate Market
- Bury St. Edmunds
  - Arc
- Cambridge
  - Grafton Centre
  - Grand Arcade
  - Lion Yard
- Canvey Island
  - Knightswick Shopping Centre
- Chelmsford
  - Bond Street
  - High Chelmer Shopping Centre
  - Meadows Shopping Centre
- Colchester
  - Culver Square
  - Lion Walk
- Dunstable
  - Quadrant Shopping Centre
- Great Yarmouth
  - Market Gates Shopping Centre
  - Victoria Arcade
- Harlow
  - The Harvey Centre
  - Queensgate Shopping Centre
- Hemel Hempstead
  - The Marlowes Shopping Centre
- Ipswich
  - The Buttermarket Centre
  - Sailmakers Shopping Centre
- King's Lynn
  - Vancouver Quarter
- Letchworth
  - Garden Square Shopping Centre
- Lowestoft
  - The Britten Centre
- Luton
  - Frasers Plus Luton (formerly Luton Point, The Mall Arndale, and Arndale Centre)
- Norwich
  - Anglia Square
  - Castle Quarter
  - Chantry Place
  - Royal Arcade
- Peterborough
  - Queensgate Shopping Centre
  - Serpentine Green
- Southend-on-Sea
  - The Royals
  - The Victoria
- Stevenage
  - The Forum
- Waltham Cross
  - Pavilions Shopping Centre
- Watford
  - Harlequin Watford (formerly atria Watford and intu Watford)
- Welwyn Garden City
  - Howard Centre
- West Thurrock
  - Lakeside Shopping Centre

=== East Midlands ===
- Buxton
  - Cavendish Arcade
  - Spring Gardens
- Chesterfield
  - The Pavements
  - Vicar Lane
- Derby
  - Park Farm Shopping Centre, Allestree
  - Derbion (formerly Intu Derby, Westfield Derby, and Eagle Centre)
- Dronfield
  - The Forge Shopping Centre
- Kettering
  - Newlands Shopping Centre
- Leicester
  - Beaumont Shopping Centre, Beaumont Leys
  - Fosse Park, Enderby
  - Haymarket Shopping Centre
  - Highcross Leicester
  - Silver Arcade
  - St Martins Square
  - Thurmaston Shopping Centre, Thurmaston
- Lincoln
  - St Marks Shopping Centre
  - Waterside Centre
- Mansfield
  - Four Seasons Shopping Centre
- Matlock Bath
  - Masson Mill Shopping Village
- Northampton
  - Grosvenor Centre
- Nottingham
  - Broadmarsh
  - Exchange Arcade
  - Flying Horse Walk
  - Victoria Centre
  - West End Arcade
- Rowsley
  - Peak Village
- Rushden
  - Rushden Lakes
- South Normanton
  - East Midlands Designer Outlet
- Spalding
  - Springfields Outlet Shopping & Leisure
- Sutton-in-Ashfield
  - Idlewells Shopping Centre
- Wellingborough
  - Swansgate Shopping Centre (formerly Arndale Centre)

=== Greater London ===
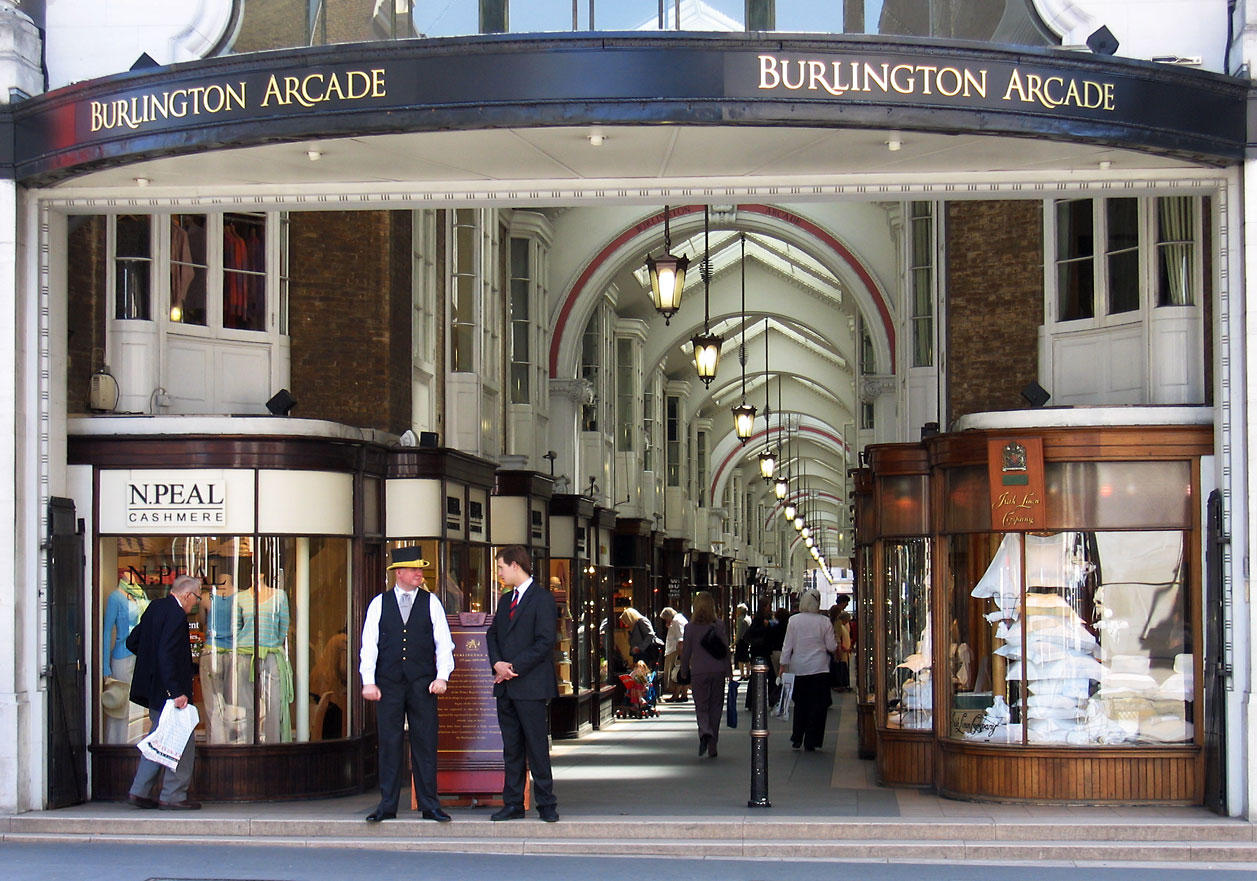
Burlington Arcade

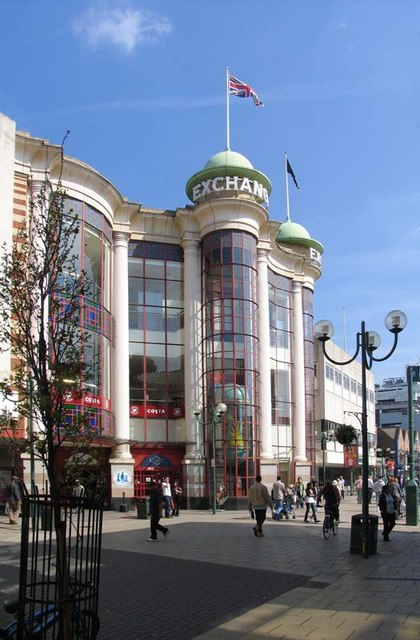
Exchange Ilford

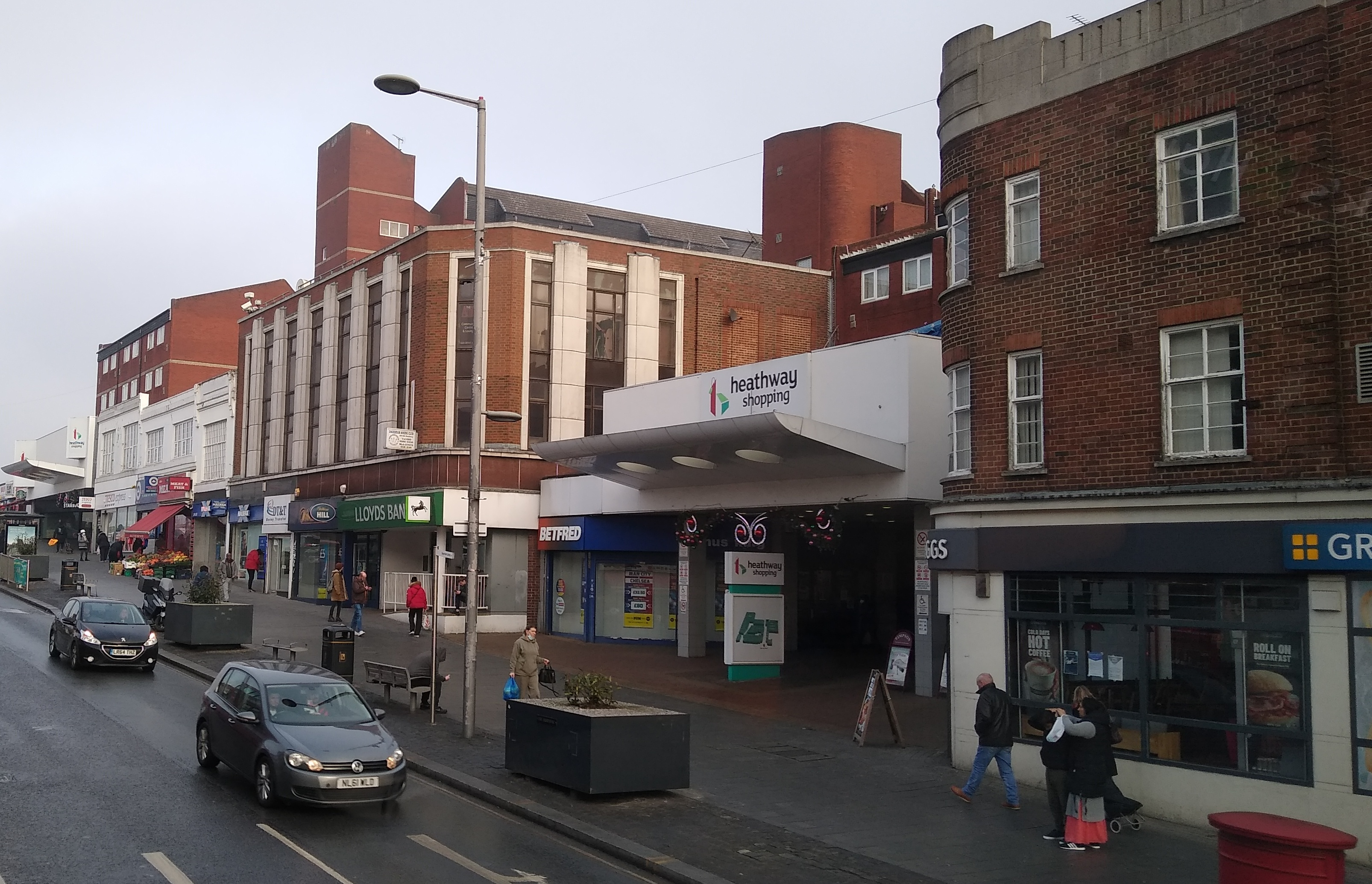
Heathway Shopping Centre

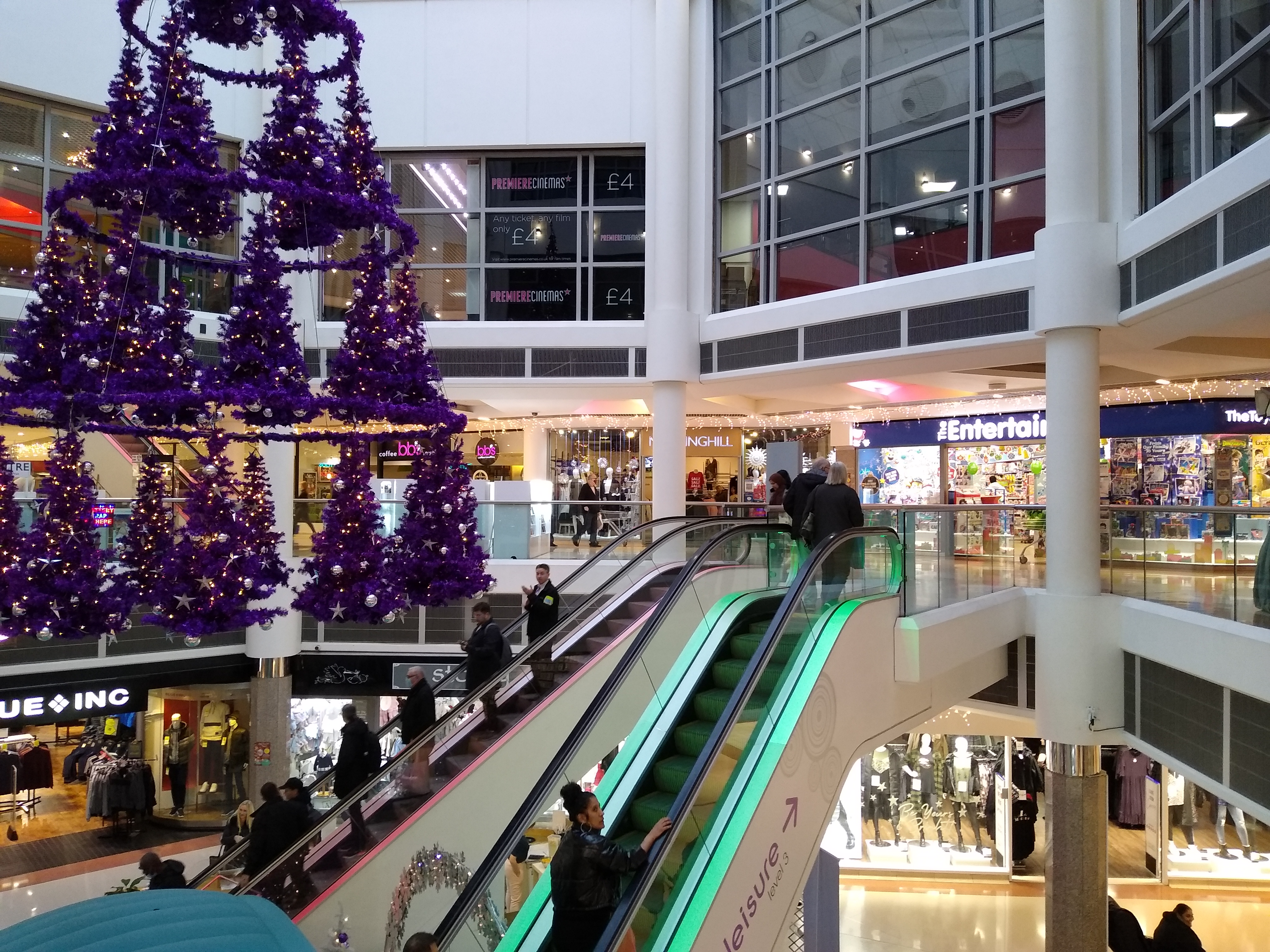
The Mercury Mall

- Barking
  - Vicarage Field
- Bexleyheath
  - Broadway Shopping Centre
- Bromley
  - The Glades
  - The Mall
- Chipping Barnet
  - The Spires Shopping Centre
- Colindale
  - Oriental City
- Croydon
  - Centrale
  - Whitgift Centre
- Dagenham
  - Heathway Shopping Centre
- Ealing
  - Arcadia Centre
  - Ealing Broadway Centre
- Edgware
  - Broadwalk Shopping Centre
- Edmonton
  - Edmonton Green Shopping Centre
- Enfield Town
  - Palace Exchange
  - Palace Gardens
- Harrow
  - St Anns
  - St George's
- Hendon
  - Brent Cross
- Hounslow
  - Blenheim Centre
  - Treaty Centre
- Ilford
  - Exchange Ilford
- Inner London
  - Angel Central, Angel
  - Aylesham Centre, Peckham
  - The Brunswick, Bloomsbury
  - Burlington Arcade, Piccadilly
  - Canary Wharf Shopping Centre, Canary Wharf
  - Kingsland Shopping Centre, Dalston
  - Elephant and Castle Shopping Centre, Elephant & Castle
  - Hay's Galleria, Southwark
  - Kensington Arcade, Kensington High Street
  - Kings Mall, Hammersmith
  - Kings Walk, Kings Road, Chelsea
  - Lewisham Shopping Centre, Lewisham
  - O2 Centre, Finchley Road
  - One New Change, Cheapside
  - Piccadilly Arcade, Piccadilly / Jermyn Street
  - Princes Arcade, Piccadilly / Jermyn Street
  - Putney Exchange, Putney
  - Southside Wandsworth, Wandsworth
  - Surrey Quays Shopping Centre, Rotherhithe
  - Victoria Place Shopping Centre, Victoria
  - West One Shopping Centre, Oxford Street
  - West 12, Shepherd's Bush
  - Westfield London, White City
  - Whiteleys, Bayswater
- Kingston upon Thames
  - The Bentall Centre
  - Cloisters Mall
  - Eden Walk
- Orpington
  - Walnuts Shopping Centre
- Penge
  - Blenheim Shopping Centre
- Romford
  - The Brewery
  - The Liberty
  - The Mercury Mall
- Stratford
  - Stratford Centre
  - Westfield Stratford City
- Sutton
  - St Nicholas Centre
  - Times Square
- Uxbridge
  - The Chimes
  - The Pavilions
- Walthamstow
  - The Mall Walthamstow
- Wembley Park
  - London Designer Outlet
- Wimbledon
  - Centre Court Shopping Centre
- Wood Green
  - The Mall Wood Green

=== North East ===
- Cramlington
  - Manor Walks Shopping Centre
- Darlington
  - Cornmill Shopping Centre
  - Queen Street Arcade
- Durham
  - The Riverwalk (formerly Milburn Gate Shopping Centre and Gates Shopping Centre)
- Gateshead
  - MetroCentre (largest shopping mall in Europe)
- Hartlepool
  - Middleton Grange Shopping Centre
- Middlesbrough
  - Cleveland Centre (formerly The Mall Middlesbrough)
  - Hill Street Shopping Centre
- Murton
  - Dalton Park
- Newcastle
  - Central Arcade
  - Eldon Garden
  - Eldon Square Shopping Centre
  - Monument Mall Shopping Centre
  - Newgate Shopping Centre
- North Shields
  - Royal Quays
- South Shields
  - Wellington Square
- Stockton
  - Wellington Square
- Sunderland
  - The Bridges
- Washington
  - Washington Galleries

=== North West ===
- Accrington
  - Accrington Arndale
- Ashton-under-Lyne
  - Ashton Arcades
- Blackburn
  - The Mall Blackburn (formerly Blackburn Shopping Centre)
- Blackpool
  - Houndshill Shopping Centre
- Bolton
  - Crompton Place Shopping Centre (formerly Arndale Centre)
  - Market Place Shopping Centre
  - Middlebrook, Horwich/Lostock
- Bootle
  - New Strand Shopping Centre
- Burnley
  - Charter Walk Shopping Centre
- Bury
  - The Millgate Shopping Centre
  - The Rock
- Carlisle
  - The Lanes Shopping Centre
- Chester
  - Eastgate Square (formerly The Mall Grosvenor and Grosvenor Shopping Centre)
- Chorley
  - Market Walk Shopping Centre
- Clitheroe
  - Swan Court Shopping Arcade
- Crewe
  - The Market Shopping Centre
- Ellesmere Port
  - Cheshire Oaks Designer Outlet
  - Port Arcades
- Fleetwood, Lancashire
  - Affinity Lancashire
- Hyde
  - Clarendon Square Shopping Centre
- Kendal
  - Westmorland Shopping Centre
- Lancaster
  - Marketgate Shopping Centre
  - St Nicholas Arcades
- Leigh
  - Spinning Gate Shopping Centre
- Liverpool
  - Clayton Square
  - Liverpool One
  - Metquarter
  - St. John's Shopping Centre
- Manchester
  - Manchester Arndale
  - Triangle Shopping Centre
- Middleton
  - Middleton Shopping Centre (formerly Arndale Centre)
- Morecambe
  - Arndale Centre
- Nelson
  - Pendle Rise Shopping Centre (formerly Admiral Centre and Arndale Centre)
- Oldham
  - Spindles Town Square Shopping Centre
- Prescot
  - Prescot Shopping Centre
- Preston
  - Fishergate Shopping Centre
  - Miller Arcade
  - St George's Shopping Centre (formerly The Mall Preston and The Mall St. George)
- Runcorn
  - Runcorn Shopping City
- Salford
  - Salford Shopping Centre
  - Lowry Outlet Mall, Salford Quays (formerly Lowry Designer Outlet and Designer Outlet at The Lowry)
- Skelmersdale
  - Concourse Shopping Centre
- Southport
  - Marble Place Shopping Centre
  - Wayfarers Shopping Arcade (formerly Burton Arcade and Leyland Arcade)
- Stockport
  - Merseyway Shopping Centre
- Stretford
  - Stretford Mall (formerly Arndale Centre)
- Trafford
  - Trafford Centre
- Wallasey
  - Cherry Tree Shopping Centre
- Warrington
  - Cockhedge Shopping Centre
  - Golden Square Shopping Centre
  - Birchwood Shopping Centre, Birchwood
- Widnes
  - Green Oaks
- Wigan
  - The Galleries
  - Grand Arcade
- Workington
  - Washington Square

=== South East ===
- Aldershot
  - Wellington Centre
- Andover
  - Chantry Centre
- Ashford
  - Ashford Designer Outlet
  - County Square
- Aylesbury
  - Friars Square
  - Hale Leys Shopping Centre
- Banbury
  - Castle Quay Shopping Centre
- Basingstoke
  - Festival Place
  - The Malls
- Bicester
  - Bicester Village Shopping Centre
- Bletchley
  - Brunel Centre
- Bracknell
  - Bracknell Shopping Centre
- Brighton
  - Churchill Square
- Broadstairs
  - Westwood Cross
- Burgess Hill
  - Market Place
  - The Martlets
- Camberley
  - The Square (formerly Mains Square and The Mall Camberley)
- Canterbury
  - Whitefriars Shopping Centre
- Chatham
  - The Pentagon Shopping Centre
- Crawley
  - County Mall
- Dartford
  - Orchards Shopping Centre
- Dorking
  - St. Martin's Walk Shopping Centre
- Dover
  - Charlton Shopping Centre
- Eastbourne
  - The Beacon (formerly Arndale Centre)
- Eastleigh
  - Swan Shopping Centre Eastleigh
- Epsom
  - The Ashley Centre
  - Spread Eagle Walk Shopping Centre
- Fareham
  - Fareham Shopping Centre
- Farnborough
  - Kingsmead
  - Princes Mead Shopping Centre
- Fleet
  - Hart Centre
- Gillingham
  - Hempstead Valley, Hempstead
- Greenhithe
  - Bluewater
- Guildford
  - The Friary Centre (formerly Westfield Friary Shopping Centre)
  - Tunsgate Quarter
  - White Lion Walk
- Hastings
  - Priory Meadow Shopping Centre
- Havant
  - Meridian Shopping (formerly Meridian Centre)
- Haywards Heath
  - Orchards Shopping Centre
- High Wycombe
  - Chilterns Shopping Centre
  - Eden Shopping, Buckinghamshire
  - Octagon Shopping Centre
- Horsham
  - Swan Walk
- Littlehampton
  - The Arcade
- Maidenhead
  - Nicholsons Shopping Centre
- Maidstone
  - Fremlin Walk
  - The Mall Maidstone (formerly Chequers Centre and Stoneborough Centre)
- Milton Keynes
  - Central Milton Keynes Shopping Centre
- Newbury
  - Kennet Shopping (formerly The Kennet Centre)
- Oxford
  - Clarendon Shopping Centre
  - Golden Cross
  - Templars Square shopping centre, Cowley
  - Westgate Oxford
- Portsmouth
  - Cascades Shopping Centre
  - Gunwharf Quays
- Reading
  - Broad Street Mall
  - Friars Walk
  - The Oracle
- Redhill
  - The Belfry
- Ringwood
  - The Furlong
- Tunbridge Wells
  - Royal Victoria Place (formerly Westfield Royal Victoria Place)
- Shoreham-by-Sea
  - Holmbush Centre
- Sittingbourne
  - The Forum
- Slough
  - Queensmere Observatory (formerly Queensmere Shopping Centre and Observatory Shopping Centre)
- Southampton
  - Bargate Centre
  - East Street Shopping Centre
  - Marlands Shopping Centre (formerly The Mall Southampton)
  - Westquay
- Staines
  - Elmsleigh Centre
- Tonbridge
  - Angel Centre
  - The Pavilion Shopping Centre
- Wickham, Hampshire
  - Bay Tree Walk
  - Warwick Lane
- Winchester
  - The Brooks
- Windsor
  - King Edward Court
  - Windsor Royal Shopping
- Witney
  - Woolgate Shopping Centre
- Woking
  - The Peacocks
  - Wolsey Place
- Worthing
  - Guildbourne Centre
  - Montague Centre
  - Royal Arcade

=== South West ===
- Barnstaple
  - Green Lanes Shopping Centre
- Bath
  - SouthGate, Bath
- Bideford
  - Atlantic Village
- Bournemouth
  - The Arcade
  - Avenue Shopping Centre
  - Castlepoint
  - Quadrant Shopping Centre
  - Sovereign Centre, Boscombe
- Bradford-on-Avon
  - Weaver's Walk
- Bridgwater
  - Angel Place Shopping Centre
- Bristol
  - Broadwalk
  - Cabot Circus
  - The Mall at Cribbs Causeway, Patchway, South Gloucestershire
  - The Galleries
- Cheltenham
  - Beechwood Shopping Centre
  - Regent Arcade Shopping Centre
- Chippenham
  - Borough Parade Shopping Centre
  - Emery Gate Shopping Centre
- Dorchester
  - Tudor Arcade
- Exeter
  - Guildhall Shopping Centre
  - The Harlequin Centre
  - Princesshay
- Frome
  - The Westway Shopping Centre
- Gloucester
  - Eastgate Shopping Centre (formerly The Mall Eastgate and The Mall Gloucester)
  - Kings Walk Shopping Centre
- Kingswood, South Gloucestershire
  - Kings Chase Centre
- Newton Abbot
  - Market Walk
- Paignton
  - Crossways Centre
  - Victoria Square
- Penzance
  - Wharfside Shopping Centre
- Plymouth
  - Armada Centre
  - Drake Circus
- Poole
  - Dolphin Shopping Centre (formerly Arndale Centre)
- Salisbury
  - Cross Keys Shopping Centre
- Street
  - Clarks Village
- Stroud
  - Merrywalks
- Swindon
  - Brunel Centre
  - Swindon Designer Outlet
  - West Swindon Shopping Centre
- Taunton
  - Orchard Shopping Centre
- Torquay
  - Fleet Walk
  - Union Square (formerly Haldon Centre)
- Trowbridge
  - Castle Place Shopping Centre
  - The Shires Shopping Centre
- Weston-super-Mare
  - Sovereign Shopping Centre
- Worle
  - Castlemead Shopping Centre
  - Queensway Centre
- Yate
  - Yate Shopping Centre

=== West Midlands ===
- Birmingham
  - Bull Ring
  - City Plaza
  - Chelmsley Wood Shopping Centre, Chelmsley Wood
  - Grand Central
  - The Mailbox
  - Martineau Place
  - Northfield Shopping Centre
  - One Stop Shopping Centre, Perry Barr
- Brierley Hill
  - Merry Hill
- Burton-upon-Trent
  - Coopers Square
  - Octagon Shopping Centre
- Coventry
  - Arena Park Shopping Centre
  - Cathedral Lanes Shopping Centre
  - Lower Precinct
  - West Orchards Shopping Centre
- Halesowen
  - The Cornbow Centre
- Hanley, Stoke-on-Trent
  - The Potteries
- Hereford
  - Maylord Shopping Centre
  - Old Market
- Leamington Spa
  - Royal Priors
- Lichfield
  - Three Spires Shopping Centre
- Nuneaton
  - Ropewalk Shopping Centre
- Redditch
  - Kingfisher Shopping Centre
- Rugby
  - Clock Towers Shopping Centre
- Shrewsbury
  - Darwin Shopping Centre
  - Pride Hill Shopping Centre
- Solihull
  - Mell Square
  - Touchwood
- Stafford
  - Guildhall Shopping Centre
- Stourbridge
  - The Ryemarket
- Stratford-upon-Avon
  - Maybird Centre
- Sutton Coldfield
  - The Mall Sutton Coldfield
  - New Hall Walk
  - Red Rose Centre
- Tamworth
  - Ankerside Shopping Centre
- Telford
  - Telford Shopping Centre
- Walsall
  - The Saddler Centre
  - Victorian Arcade, Walsall
- Wolverhampton
  - Mander Centre
  - Wulfrun Centre
- Worcester
  - Cathedral Plaza Shopping Centre
  - Crowngate Shopping Centre

=== Yorkshire and the Humber ===
- Barnsley
  - Alhambra Shopping Centre (formerly The Mall Alhambra and The Mall Barnsley)
  - The Metropolitan Centre
- Beverley
  - Flemingate
- Bradford
  - The Broadway
  - Kirkgate Centre (closed June 2026)
  - Rawson Quarter
- Castleford
  - Carlton Lanes Shopping Centre
- Doncaster
  - Frenchgate Centre (formerly Arndale Centre)
- Grimsby
  - Freshney Place (formerly Riverhead Centre)
- Harrogate
  - Victoria Gardens Shopping Centre
- Huddersfield
  - Kingsgate Shopping Centre
  - Piazza Centre
- Keighley
  - Airedale Shopping Centre
- Hull
  - North Point Shopping Centre
  - Princes Quay
  - The Prospect Centre
  - St. Stephen's Hull
- Leeds
  - The Core (formerly The Schofields Centre and The Headrow Centre)
  - Corn Exchange
  - Crossgates Shopping Centre, Cross Gates (formerly Arndale Centre)
  - Holt Park District Centre, Holt Park
  - Penny Hill Centre, Hunslet
  - Merrion Centre
  - The Light
  - St. John's Centre
  - Trinity Leeds (formerly Bond Street Centre and Leeds Shopping Plaza)
  - Victoria Gate
  - Victoria Quarter
  - White Rose Centre
- Scarborough
  - Brunswick Shopping Centre
- Scunthorpe
  - The Parishes
- Sheffield
  - Crystal Peaks
  - Hillsborough Shopping Exchange
  - Meadowhall
  - The Moor Quarter
  - Orchard Square
- Wakefield
  - The Ridings Centre
  - Trinity Walk
- Wetherby
  - Horsefair Centre
- York
  - Coppergate Shopping Centre
  - York Designer Outlet

== Northern Ireland ==
- Antrim
  - Castle Mall
  - The Junction
- Ballymena
  - Fairhill Shopping Centre
  - Tower Centre
- Banbridge
  - The Boulevard
- Bangor
  - Flagship Shopping Centre (closed 2019)
  - Lesley Bloomfield
- Belfast
  - CastleCourt
  - Connswater Shopping Centre (closed on March 21st, 2025)
  - Flax Centre, Ardoyne
  - The Gallery (proposed)
  - Great Northern Mall
  - Kennedy Centre
  - Lesley Forestside, Newtownbreda
  - The Park Centre
  - Royal Exchange (proposed)
  - Victoria Square
  - Westwood Centre
- Carryduff
  - Carryduff Shopping Centre
- Coleraine
  - Diamond Shopping Centre
- Craigavon
  - Rushmere Shopping Centre
- Derry
  - Foyleside Shopping Centre
  - Lisnagelvin Centre
  - Quayside Centre
  - Richmond Centre
- Dungannon
  - Oaks Shopping Centre
- Enniskillen
  - Erneside Shopping Centre
- Holywood
  - Holywood Exchange
- Lisburn
  - Bow Street Mall
  - Sprucefield
- Magherafelt
  - Meadowlane Shopping Centre
- Newry
  - Buttercrane Shopping Centre
  - The Quays
- Newtownabbey
  - Lesley Abbeycentre
- Newtownards
  - Ards Shopping Centre
- Omagh
  - Main Street Mall
- Portadown
  - High Street Mall
  - Magowan West
  - Meadows Shopping Centre

== Scotland ==
- Aberdeen
  - Aberdeen Market (closed 2020)
  - The Academy Shopping Centre
  - Bon Accord Centre (including the former St. Nicholas Shopping Centre)
  - Trinity Centre
  - Union Square
- Arbroath
  - Abbeygate Shopping Centre
- Ayr
  - Ayr Central
  - Kyle Centre
- Clydebank
  - Clyde Shopping Centre
- Cumbernauld
  - Antonine Centre
  - Cumbernauld Town Centre
- Dundee
  - City Quay
  - Keiller Shopping Centre
  - Overgate Centre
  - Wellgate Centre
- Dunfermline
  - Kingsgate Centre
- East Kilbride
  - East Kilbride Shopping Centre
- Edinburgh
  - Cameron Toll Shopping Centre
  - The Gyle Shopping Centre
  - Ocean Terminal, Leith
  - St James Quarter (formerly St James Centre)
  - Waverley Market
  - Westside Plaza
- Elgin
  - St. Giles Centre
- Falkirk
  - The Mall Falkirk (formerly The Mall Howgate and Howgate Centre)
- Glenrothes
  - Kingdom Shopping Centre
- Glasgow
  - Buchanan Galleries
  - The Forge Shopping Centre
  - Glasgow Fort
  - Italian Centre
  - Princes Square
  - Sauchiehall Centre (formerly Sauchiehall Street Centre)
  - Silverburn Shopping Centre
  - St. Enoch Centre
- Greenock
  - Oak Shopping Centre
- Gretna
  - Gretna Green Famous Blacksmiths Shop
- Hamilton
  - Regent Shopping Centre
- Inverness
  - Eastgate Shopping Centre
- Irvine
  - Rivergate Centre
- Kilmarnock
  - Burns Mall
- Kirkcaldy
  - The Mercat Shopping Centre
  - The Postings
- Kirkwall, Orkney
  - Anchor Shopping Centre
- Lenzie
  - Apple Oaks Shopping Centre
- Lerwick, Shetland
  - Toll Clock Shopping Centre
- Livingston
  - Almondvale Centre
  - The Centre
- Loanhead
  - Straiton Park
- Motherwell
  - Motherwell Shopping Centre
- Paisley
  - Paisley Centre
  - The Piazza
- Perth
  - St. John's Centre
- Renfrew
  - Braehead Shopping Centre
- Stirling
  - Thistles Centre
- Tillicoultry
  - Sterling Mills

== Wales ==
=== North Wales ===
- Bangor
  - Deiniol Centre
  - Menai Centre
- Llandudno
  - Parc Llandudno
  - Victoria Centre
- Mold
  - Daniel Owen Shopping Centre
- Wrexham
  - Border Retail Park
  - Central Retail Park
  - Eagles Meadow (largest in North Wales)
  - Island Green (note: has its own railway station)
  - Plas Coch

=== South Wales ===
- Bridgend
  - Bridgend Designer Outlet
  - Bridgend Shopping Centre
  - The Rhiw Shopping Centre
- Cardiff
  - Queens Arcade
  - St. David's Centre
- Carmarthen
  - Merlins Walk
- Cwmbran
  - Cwmbran Centre
- Ebbw Vale
  - Festival Park
- Llanelli
  - St. Elli Shopping Centre
- Llantrisant
  - Talbot Green Shopping Park, Talbot Green
- Merthyr Tydfil
  - Cyfartha Retail Park
  - St. Tydfil Shopping Centre
- Newport
  - Cambrian Centre
  - Friars Walk
  - Kingsway Shopping Centre
- Port Talbot
  - Aberafan Shopping Centre
  - Baglan Bay Retail Park
- Swansea
  - Quadrant Shopping Centre

== Chains and property investment companies ==
- Arndale Centre (historic development brand)
- BMO Real Estate Partners
- British Land
- Hammerson
- Intu (historic operator)
- Landsec
- The Mall Company (now part of NewRiver)
- McArthurGlen Designer Outlets
- NewRiver
- Peel Group
- Unibail-Rodamco-Westfield

== See also ==
- List of shopping centres in the United Kingdom by size
