= Cornmill (disambiguation) =

A cornmill grinds cereal grain into flour and middlings.

Cornmill may refer to:

- Cornmill Shopping Centre, a shopping center in Darlington, England
- Cornmill Stream and Old River Lea, a biological site in Waltham Abbey, Essex
- Cornmill Stream, a minor tributary of the River Lea
- The Cornmill, building in Malton, England

== See also ==
- Mill (disambiguation)
