= List of shopping centres in the United Kingdom by size =

This is a list of the largest shopping centres in the United Kingdom, listed by retail size in square metres (m^{2}). Only centres with space of 65,000 m^{2} (700,000 sq ft) or more are listed. Some of these are out-of-town centres, while others are part of a city or town centre shopping district, which in almost all cases also includes many stores not part of the shopping centre. Many city and town centre shopping districts not represented in this list are larger than some of the centres listed.

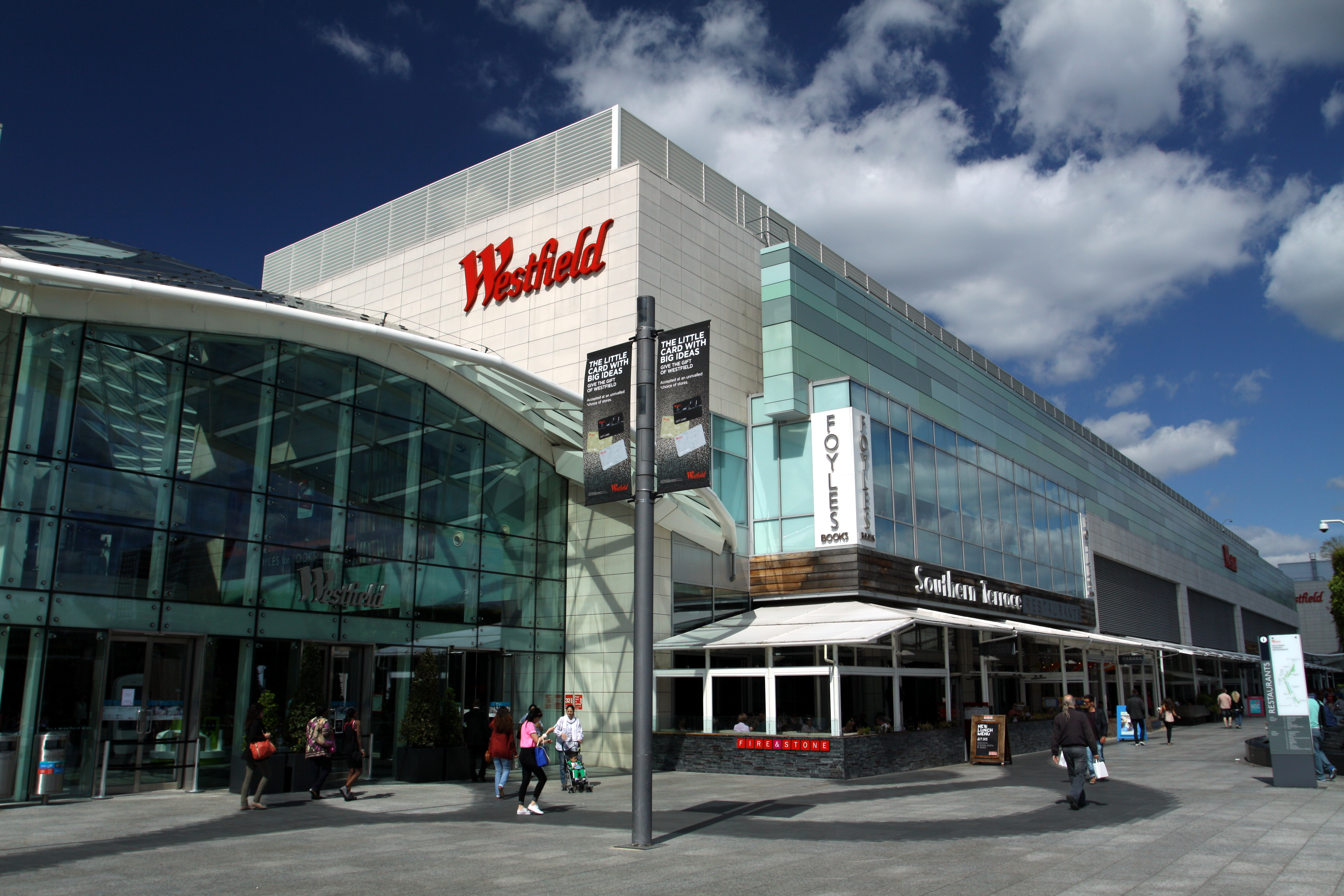
Westfield London is the largest shopping centre in the UK.

Rank	Shopping centre	City/town	Country or region	Area (m^{2})
1	Westfield London	Shepherd's Bush, London	Greater London	235,900
2	Metrocentre	Gateshead, Tyne & Wear	North East	192,900
3	Trafford Centre	Trafford, Greater Manchester	North West	188,000
4	Westfield Stratford City	Stratford, London	Greater London	184,100
5	Bluewater Shopping Centre	Stone, Kent	South East	169,200
6	Bullring Estate (Note: Bullring Estate refers to Bullring, LinkStreet & Grand Central which are all interlinked.)	Birmingham	West Midlands	163,000
7	Lakeside Shopping Centre	Thurrock, Essex	East of England	161,000
8	St James Quarter	New Town, Edinburgh	Scotland	158,000
9	Merry Hill	Brierley Hill, Dudley	West Midlands	155,200
10	Liverpool One	Liverpool	North West	154,000
11	The centre:MK	Milton Keynes, Buckinghamshire	South East	133,416
12	Harlequin Watford	Watford, Hertfordshire	East of England	130,064
13	Meadowhall	Sheffield	Yorkshire & the Humber	130,000
14	Manchester Arndale	Manchester	North West	130,000
15	St. David's	Cardiff	Wales	129,200
16	Eldon Square	Newcastle	North East	128,700
17	Derbion	Derby, Derbyshire	East Midlands	121,000
18	East Kilbride Shopping Centre	East Kilbride, Lanarkshire	Scotland	111,484
19	Cabot Circus	Bristol	South West	110,100
20	Braehead	Renfrew, Renfrewshire	Scotland	104,300
21	Kingfisher	Redditch, Worcestershire	West Midlands	102,000
22	Festival Place	Basingstoke, Hampshire	South East	102,000
23	Silverburn Centre	Pollok, Glasgow	Scotland	100,500
24	Highcross	Leicester	East Midlands	100,400
25	Telford Centre	Telford	West Midlands	100,000
26	Cribbs	Patchway, South Gloucestershire	South West	100,000
27	Westquay	Southampton, Hampshire	South East	95,600
28	Royal Victoria Place	Royal Tunbridge Wells, Kent	South East	93,200
29	Trinity Leeds	Leeds	Yorkshire & The Humber	93,000
30	The Lexicon, Bracknell	Bracknell	Berkshire	92,903
31	The Centre	Livingston, West Lothian	Scotland	92,900
32	Victoria Centre	Nottingham	East Midlands	90,700
33	Brent Cross	Hendon, London	Greater London	85,200
34	Frasers Plus Luton	Luton, Bedfordshire	East of England	84,000
35	White Rose Centre	Leeds	Yorkshire & The Humber	82,320
36	Cwmbran Centre	Cwmbran, Torfaen	Wales	79,000
37	Eden	High Wycombe, Buckinghamshire	South East	79,000
38	St. Enoch Centre	Glasgow	Scotland	77,000
39	Victoria Square	Belfast	Northern Ireland	75,000
40	Queensgate	Peterborough	East of England	74,700
41	Westgate Oxford	Oxford, Oxfordshire	South East	74,322
42	The Merrion Centre	Leeds	Yorkshire & The Humber	74,300
43	Whitgift Centre	Croydon	Greater London	74,100
44	Frenchgate Centre	Doncaster, South Yorkshire	Yorkshire & The Humber	74,000
45	The Oracle	Reading, Berkshire	South East	71,800

== See also ==
- List of shopping centres in the United Kingdom
- List of the world's largest shopping malls
- List of largest shopping malls in Canada
- List of largest shopping malls in the United States
- Impact of the COVID-19 pandemic on retail
