= RVP =

RVP may refer to:

== People ==
- Robin van Persie (born 1983), Dutch footballer
- Ryan Van Poederooyen (born 1983), Canadian drummer

== Political parties ==
- Rehoboth Volksparty, Namibia
- Rechtse Volkspartij, Netherlands
- Ruotsalainen vapaamielinen puolue, Liberal Swedish Party
- Rahvuslik Vabameelne Partei, National Liberal Party (Estonia)

== Other ==
- Revolution Populi cryptocurrency
- RVP (film), Fujichrome Velviacolor reversal films
- Reid vapor pressure
- Royal Victoria Place, a shopping centre in Tunbridge Wells, England
- Royal Variety Performance, an annual televised variety show in the United Kingdom
