= Erneside Shopping Centre =

Shopping centre in Enniskillen, Northern Ireland

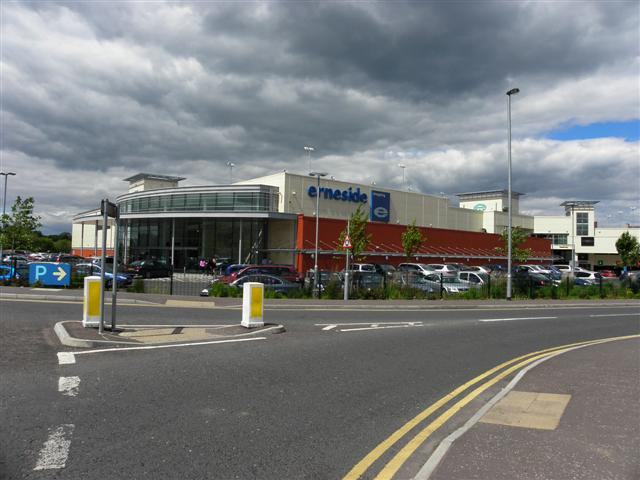
- Location: Enniskillen, County Fermanagh, Northern Ireland
- Opened: 1989; 37 years ago
- Owner: Muntermellan Ltd
- Num. of stores: 34
- Num. of anchor tenants: 2
- Floor area: 171,590 sq ft
- Floors: 2
- Parking: 638
- Website: https://ernesidecentre.com

Erneside Shopping Centre is a shopping centre in Enniskillen, County Fermanagh, Northern Ireland.

Sitting at the River Erne, the centre opened in 1989 and is around 171,590 sq ft. The anchor tenants of the centre are Marks & Spencer (closing in 2026) and Next.

== History ==
The centre was opened in 1989. In 1997, Erneside was acquired by the Diageo Pension Trust, the company helped the centre double in size, once in 2000 and another in 2008. One of its anchor tenants, Asda, closed its doors in the centre in 2007 to move to bigger premises nearby.

In 2012, Erneside was announced to get a major expansion that would see it get a larger second floor, a hotel and a cinema but it never happened, the idea was brought up again in 2014 and 2015 but in a downsized state.

In 2015, the centre was sold by the Diageo Pension Trust to Tristan Capital Partners and Ellandi for £34.25m. The new owners helped expand the centre slightly with an upsized Next store and new stores, by 2025, the centre was only 7% in vacant units.

Erneside's co-owner Ellandi was acquired by NewRiver in 2024, with NewRiver co-owning and managing Erneside from then onward.

In 2025, Erneside lost 2 tenants (Harry Corry and anchor tenant Marks & Spencer) to the new Lakelands retail park in the outskirts of Enniskillen, the centre also opposed a proposal at the retail park where Lidl is planning to build a store, saying it will hurt Enniskillen's town centre if it gets the go-ahead.

In December 2025, Erneside was sold by Tristan and NewRiver for £12.4m to a consortium led by Ian McMahon under holding company Muntermellan Limited, the same consortium owns the Rushmere and Foyleside shopping centres. The centre is set to go through a massive revamp similar to the 2 centres have already gone through, making the biggest change for the centre since 2008, with hopes of Erneside becoming as successful as Rushmere and Foyleside.

In February 2026, Erneside announced a major investment program which would completely overhaul the centre for the first time since 2008, it would get a more modernised design with a more luxurious appearance.

== Stores ==
Some of the store offerings in the centre include Argos, River Island, Next, Pandora, Poundland and JD Sports.
