= Connswater Shopping Centre =

Former shopping centre in Belfast, Northern Ireland

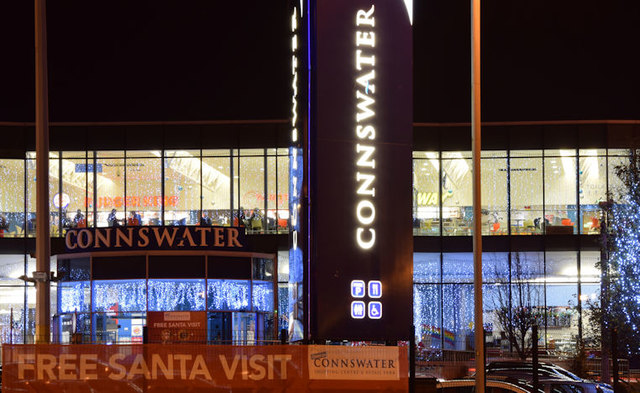
- Connswater Shopping Centre, in 2015
- Location: Belfast, Northern Ireland
- Address: Bloomfield Avenue, Belfast, BT5 5LP
- Opened: c. April 1983
- Closed: 21 March 2025
- Owner: Connswater SC Limited.
- Num. of stores: 52
- Floor area: 162,000 sq ft (15,100 m^{2})
- Floors: 1

Connswater Shopping Centre was a shopping centre in east Belfast, Northern Ireland. It opened in 1983 and was one of the early large-scale shopping centres in Northern Ireland. The centre closed permanently on 21 March 2025 after 42 years of trading.

== History ==
=== 1983-2004: Construction, opening and expansion ===
Before the centre was constructed, the space was home to the Belfast Ropeworks. Construction started on the shopping centre in 1982 and it opened in April 1983. Its development began in the early 1980s and was completed in phases by 1994, making it one of Northern Ireland's older shopping centres.

The indoor mall originally had a T-shaped layout with two large anchor units occupied by a 57,000 sq ft Stewarts Crazy Prices supermarket and a 22,000 sq ft Dunnes Stores department store, alongside 19 smaller retail units.

In 1994, the shopping centre was expanded to contain 29 more units, with the three junior anchors of the expansion being the Dresswell clothing shop, a Next department store and a Woolworths superstore. The expansion also added a new retail park in place of some abandoned buildings.

In May 1996, Stewarts Crazy Prices rebranded into a Tesco superstore following its acquisition.

=== 2004-2019: Decline in shop numbers and revitalisation ===
In 2008, Connswater Shopping Centre received a renovation and expansion to add a new food court with 5 units and a refurbishment to the entrance to the centre. The renovation was built by 2009.

In the same year, store and restaurant closures in Connswater became more frequent which included the closure of several occupiers including Eason, Going Places, Life Style Sports, Next, Pickwicks and Woolworths.

In Autumn 2012, Tesco rebranded and refurbished its unit inside the centre and it reopened as a Tesco Metro on 19 November 2012.

On 28 January 2015, Tesco announced that it would be closing 43 underperforming stores in the United Kingdom as part of plans to cut costs. The Connswater Tesco Metro was one of those stores, having been operating for almost 19 years. The store closed on 4 April 2015, and 92 staff were laid off.

On 19 February 2015, Dunnes Stores announced that it was closing its Connswater store after 32 years of trading. The store closed on 23 February 2015.

In August 2017, it was announced that variety store The Range would open a 57,000 sq ft store in the former Tesco Metro unit after 2 years without an anchor inside the centre. The shop opened in January 2018 after making a £3 million investment.

On 19 October 2018, Savers opened its 20th store in Northern Ireland inside the centre with 12 new jobs.

On 3 December 2018, Brand Max opened in the former Dunnes Stores space and was the first time Connswater had two fully open anchors in three years. Sports Direct would open nine days later on 12 December 2018 in the former Re:Store unit.

=== 2020-2025: Decline in foot traffic and closure ===
The COVID-19 pandemic caused the centre and retail park to close for a few weeks alongside some retailers inside the centre closing permanently such as Argos. After the pandemic, more retailers closed its doors inside the centre such as EE and Shoe Zone moving out pre-Christmas 2023 and Specsavers moving to the adjacent Connswater Retail Park in March 2024.

In February 2022, Dubai-based ChicKing opened its only Northern Irish restaurant in Connswater's former The Streat café which had been closed since 2016, and fitting out the unit took 18 months to open. The ChicKing later closed in 2023 after a few months.

In Summer 2022, Connswater's opening hours changed from 9:00 am-9:00 pm to 9:00 am-6:00 pm; this was mainly to save money. In the same year, GAME and Sports Direct moved into sections of Brand Max. In January 2024, it was announced that Brand Max, alongside Sports Direct and GAME would close down its store inside Connswater Shopping Centre in the coming months. The store closed on 16 March 2024. The last remaining bank in the shopping centre, Halifax, closed on 10 February 2025.

In March 2025, it was announced that Connswater Shopping Centre would close after fixed charge receivers were appointed. The closure was attributed to difficult trading conditions and the loss of major tenants. At the time of the announcement, the 162,000 sq ft centre had 52 units, but only 20 traders remained, including Boots, the last remaining original shop in the centre, and The Range, which would stay open.

Access to the centre was blocked by 5:30 pm, and finally closed permanently at 6:00 pm on 21 March 2025. The adjacent retail park, including The Range and Lidl units, was not affected by the closure and remained operational.

== Connswater Retail Park ==
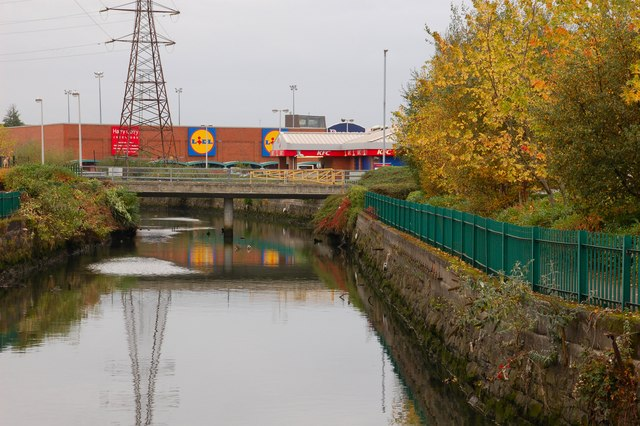
Connswater Retail Park in October 2007. The Harry Corry and Lidl are now a Home Bargains superstore, and the Dreams is now a Halfords.

Connswater Retail Park (alternatively called Arches Retail Park) is an adjacent retail park added during the 1994 expansion. The site was built on some abandoned buildings, and opened in 1994 with various retailers including Budget, JJB Sports, Harry Corry and Lidl. There were additional restaurant units occupied by KFC, McDonald's and Pizza Hut.

As of November 2026, the retail park is fully occupied by various retailers including a B&M Home Store, a Cancer Research UK superstore, Halfords, Home Bargains, Jollyes, Lidl, Specsavers and Ulster Bank. Restaurants that occupy several units include KFC, McDonald's, Starbucks and Tim Hortons. The Range, which was a former anchor of the closed shopping centre, is also a unit.

On 29 April 2015, Lidl announced a multi-million pound expansion of its existing store at Connswater Retail Park by expanding into three units previously occupied by Halfords, Carpetright and JJB Sports and merging them into a large, 23,000 sq ft superstore on a 25-year lease. This investment would create up to 15 jobs in the area if planning was approved. The planners recommended the council to reject the proposal in May 2016, but it was backed in the following month and Lidl secured permission to expand its store. The new Lidl superstore opened in July 2017.

Starbucks opened in the former Pizza Hut space which had been occupied by local buffet Origin since 2016 in February 2017, and in the same year, Home Bargains announced that it would open in the former Harry Corry and Lidl units, with the latter moving to a bigger unit merging three vacant units together. The 20,000 sq ft store would open on 2 December 2017. Tim Hortons opened in the former Carpetright space which had been in use since the 2014 Carpetright fire occurred on 12 December 2018.

== Incidents ==
=== 1997 loyalist protests ===
When Tony Blair and Belfast Lord Mayor Alban Maginness visited Connswater Shopping Centre in October 1997, a protest about the Good Friday Agreement occurred and the police were involved. They struggled to keep the protestors away from the Prime Minister, but they kept chanting and some had paper posters saying "We Demand Freedom For Our Faith Flag & Culture" with the Union Jack flag on the paper. Tony Blair was 'booed and heckled' at the centre while the protest was still going.

=== 2014 Carpetright fire ===
At around 1:45 pm on 7 June 2014, two unidentified arsonists that were thought to be teenagers started a fire at the Carpetright store at the adjacent Connswater Retail Park that caused damage to the Halfords beside the unit and the former JJB Sports next to it. Forty firefighters came to the shop to tackle the blaze a few minutes later. Two days later on 9 June, the two arsonists were caught on CCTV committing arson on the store two days ago. The store was later demolished and rebuilt between July and October 2014. After the fire, Halfords moved to the unit previously occupied by Dreams, and Carpetright moved to the former Xtra-vision unit.

=== 2026 anti-social behaviour incidents ===
Three incidents including anti-social behaviour happened between 15 April and 9 May, respectively.

At around 7:25 pm on 15 April 2026, a 14-year-old girl was detained by police from damaging the centre entirely. The following day at 5:30 pm, officers were noted that youths had been re-entering the centre. Because of this, three young teenagers were detained for causing extensive damage to the centre.

Following a band parade on the Newtownards Road on 9 May 2026, large groups of young teens gathered on the road and caused damage to windows on two fast food restaurants occupied by McDonald's and KFC, which caused the restaurants to close early due to the disorder.

== See also ==
- List of shopping centres in the United Kingdom
