= St Nicholas Arcades =

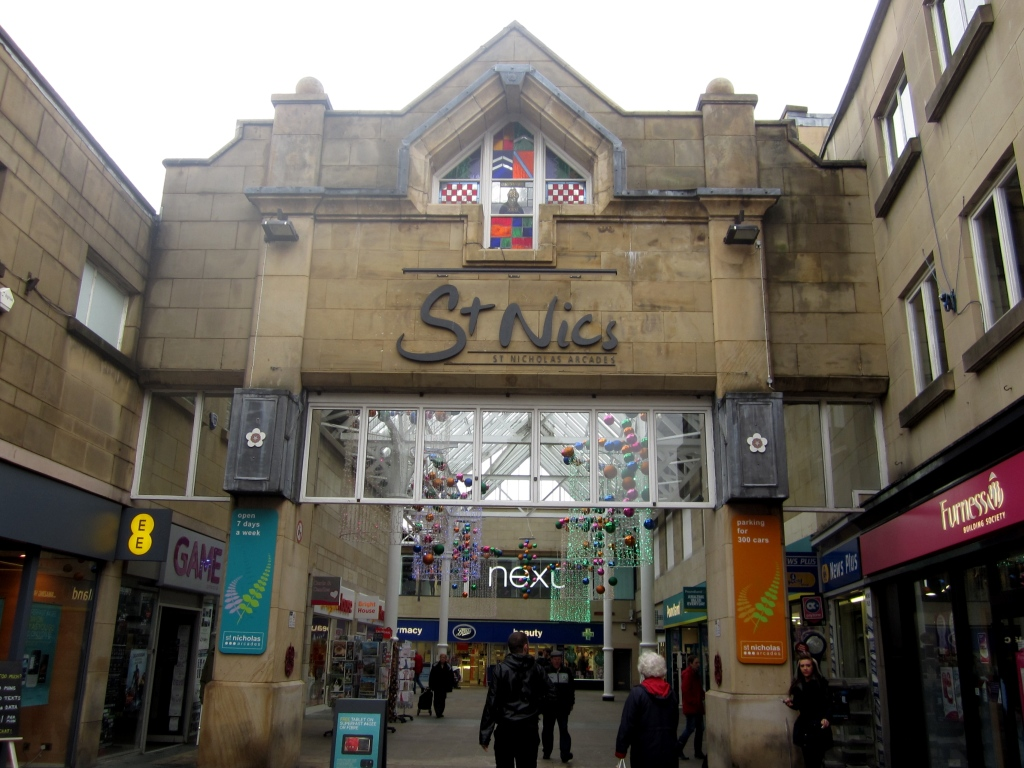
- Cheapside entrance, on the shopping centre's western side
- Location: Lancaster, Lancashire, England
- Coordinates: 54°02′56″N 2°47′57″W
- Address: 12 Lancaster Gate
- Opened: c. 1971 (55 years ago)
- Floors: 1
- Website: www.stnicholasarcades.co.uk

St Nicholas Arcades (also known as St Nics) is a shopping mall in Lancaster, England. Located on Lancaster Gate, it opened in the early 1970s and, as of 2025, it attracts around four million visitors annually. It underwent a major refurbishment between 1989 and 1990.

The property was built on the site of a 17th-century Unitarian chapel. St Nicholas Street was demolished to make way for the shopping centre. The building which once housed the Picturedome, Lancaster's earliest cinema, was also demolished.

== See also ==
- List of shopping centres in the United Kingdom
