= Lesley Bloomfield Shopping Centre =

Shopping complex in Bangor, Northern Ireland

Coordinates: 54°38′50″N 5°39′23″W

Lesley Bloomfield
- Location: Bangor, County Down, Northern Ireland
- Opened: 1992; 34 years ago
- Owner: Mussenden Properties Limited
- Num. of stores: 49
- Num. of anchor tenants: 2
- Floor area: 288,234 sq ft (2.68 ha)
- Floors: 1
- Website: www.lesleybloomfield.com

Lesley Bloomfield Shopping Centre (formerly known as Bloomfield Shopping Centre) is a shopping centre and retail park in Bangor, County Down, Northern Ireland.

Opened in 1992 and anchored by Tesco and Marks & Spencer, the entire development itself spans 425,085 sq ft (3.95 ha) across the shopping centre, retail park and other standalone businesses which separately span 288,234 sq ft (2.68 ha), 113,114 sq ft (1.05 ha) and 23,737 sq ft (0.22 ha) respectively.

== History ==
The shopping centre part of Bloomfield opened in 1992 while the retail park opened in 1994. The centre featured the first drive-thru McDonald's restaurant in Northern Ireland.

The centre was refurbished in 2000 and was expanded significantly in 2002 to accommodate significantly upsized stores for Tesco and M&S. M&S later upsized their store again in 2007. The centre was sold for £61 million in 2002 to Donegal Place Investments Limited, a company owned by Michael Herbert and Pat McCormack.

In 2004, a two-storey expansion to the centre was proposed, adding British Home Stores as another anchor tenant. The plan never went ahead. In 2006, the centre announced changes which included more parking, a revamp to the retail park's facade along with 3 new retail park units and a new and expanded entrance. It was completed by 2007.

After being put into receivership in 2014, Donegal Place Investments sold Bloomfield for £54.5 million to Ellandi and Tristan Capital Partners.

In 2021, the centre announced that two drive-thru units would be built and would be occupied by Starbucks and Tim Hortons respectively. They opened in the same year.

In 2024, the centre was sold to Mussenden Properties Limited, a company owned by former co-owner Michael Herbert and his wife Lesley Herbert, for £22 million. The centre was renamed to Lesley Bloomfield and it was announced that the centre would double in size, with a cinema and residential properties being planned. In the same year, planning permission was being sought for an expansion to the centre's entrance, adding 3 new units and public realm changes. It was approved in 2025.

In June 2026, it was announced that Iceland would open a new store under its Food Warehouse facia in Unit 1 of the retail park, in a £1.5m investment. The store, which is the biggest of its kind in Northern Ireland, officially opened in September 2026.

== Stores ==
Alongside Tesco and M&S, the centre has a retail offering such as TK Maxx, Next, JD Sports, Warren James, Boots, Goldsmiths and Smyths Toys. The centre also has a strong food offering such as Bull and Bear Grill, McDonald's, Auntie Anne's, Burger King and Blue Chicago Grill. Retail park tenants includes stores such as Iceland, Sports Direct, B&M and Harry Corry.
