= Victorian Arcade, Walsall =

Victorian Arcade
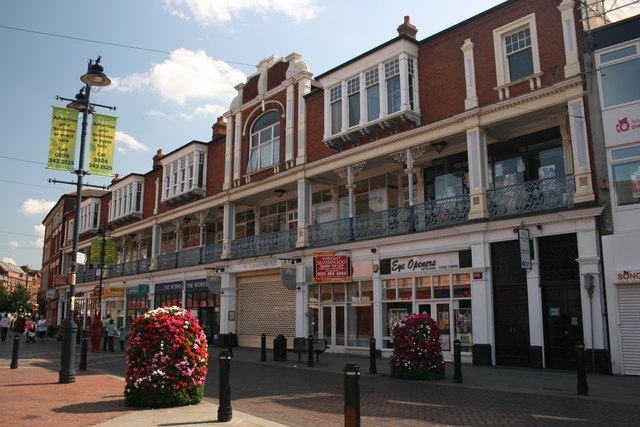
- The frontage on Bradford Street, showing the first-floor balcony
- Interactive map of the Victorian Arcade area

General information
- Status: Grade II listed
- Type: Shopping arcade
- Location: Walsall, West Midlands, United Kingdom
- Coordinates: 52°35′01.51″N 1°58′53.96″W grid reference SP 013 984
- Completed: 1897

Victorian Arcade, in Walsall, West Midlands, is a shopping arcade in the town centre, built in the 1890s. It is a Grade II listed building;

== History and description ==
The site, formerly the Shambles, a meat market dating from the medieval period, was redeveloped as a shopping arcade in 1895–7. The architect was Jonathon Ellis. Originally named Digbeth Arcade, it has been restored in recent years, and renamed Victorian Arcade. The T-shaped plan is unchanged from the original design.

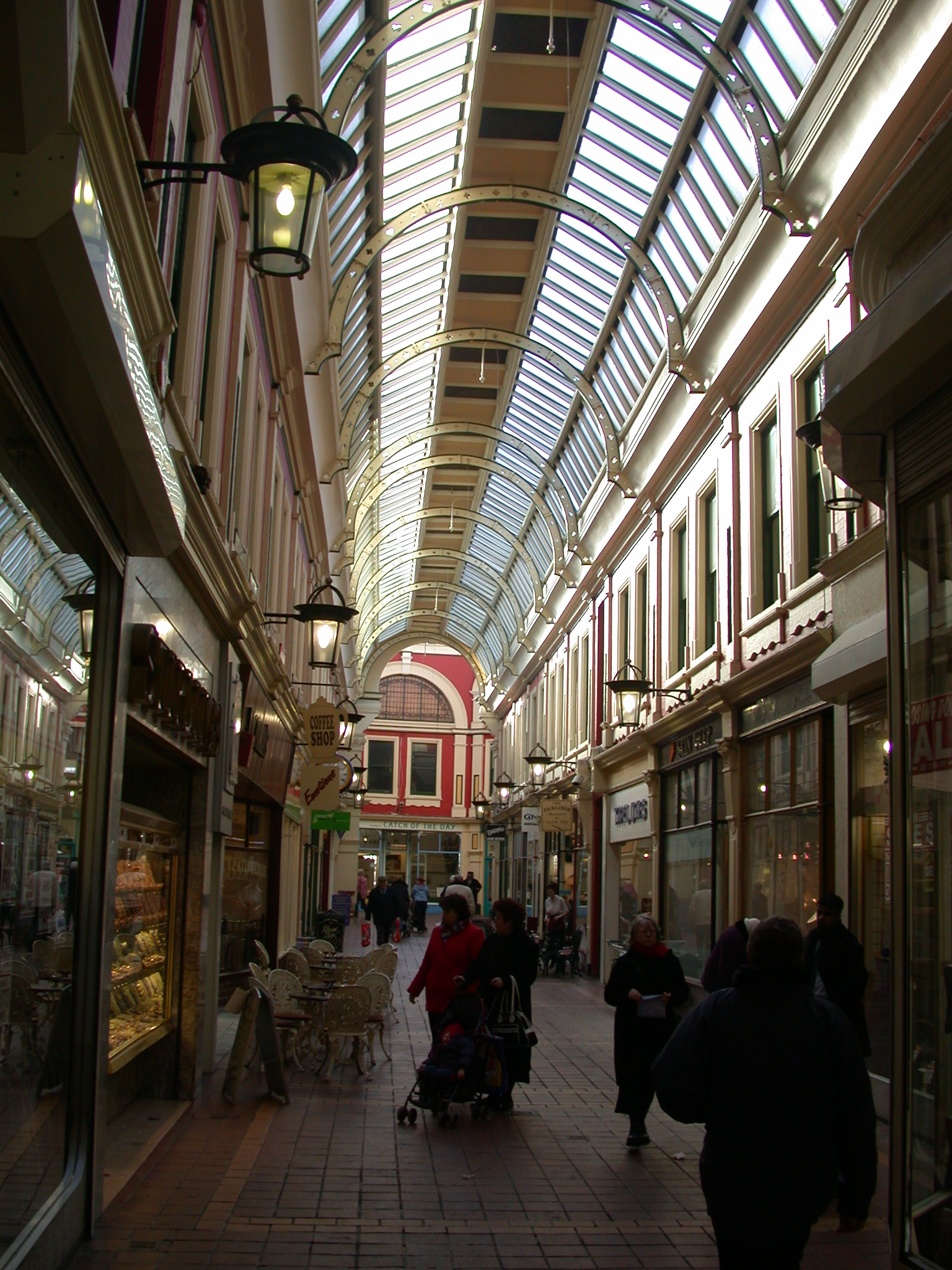
Inside the arcade

There are entrances on Bradford Street on the north-west, Digbeth Street on the north-east and Lower Hall Lane on the south-east. The frontage on Bradford Street has a first-floor balcony of five bays: there are iron balustrades, with shops and office chambers behind. There are timber oriel windows on the floor above. There was originally a five-bay upper floor on the Digbeth Street frontage, replaced during the 20th century.

Inside, the arms of the arcade have a barrel-vaulted glass roof; they meet at an octagonal space under a glazed dome. Some of the shop fronts in the arcade are original.

== See also ==
- List of shopping centres in the United Kingdom
