= Sailmakers Shopping Centre =

Coordinates: 52.05835°N 1.15425°E

Sailmakers

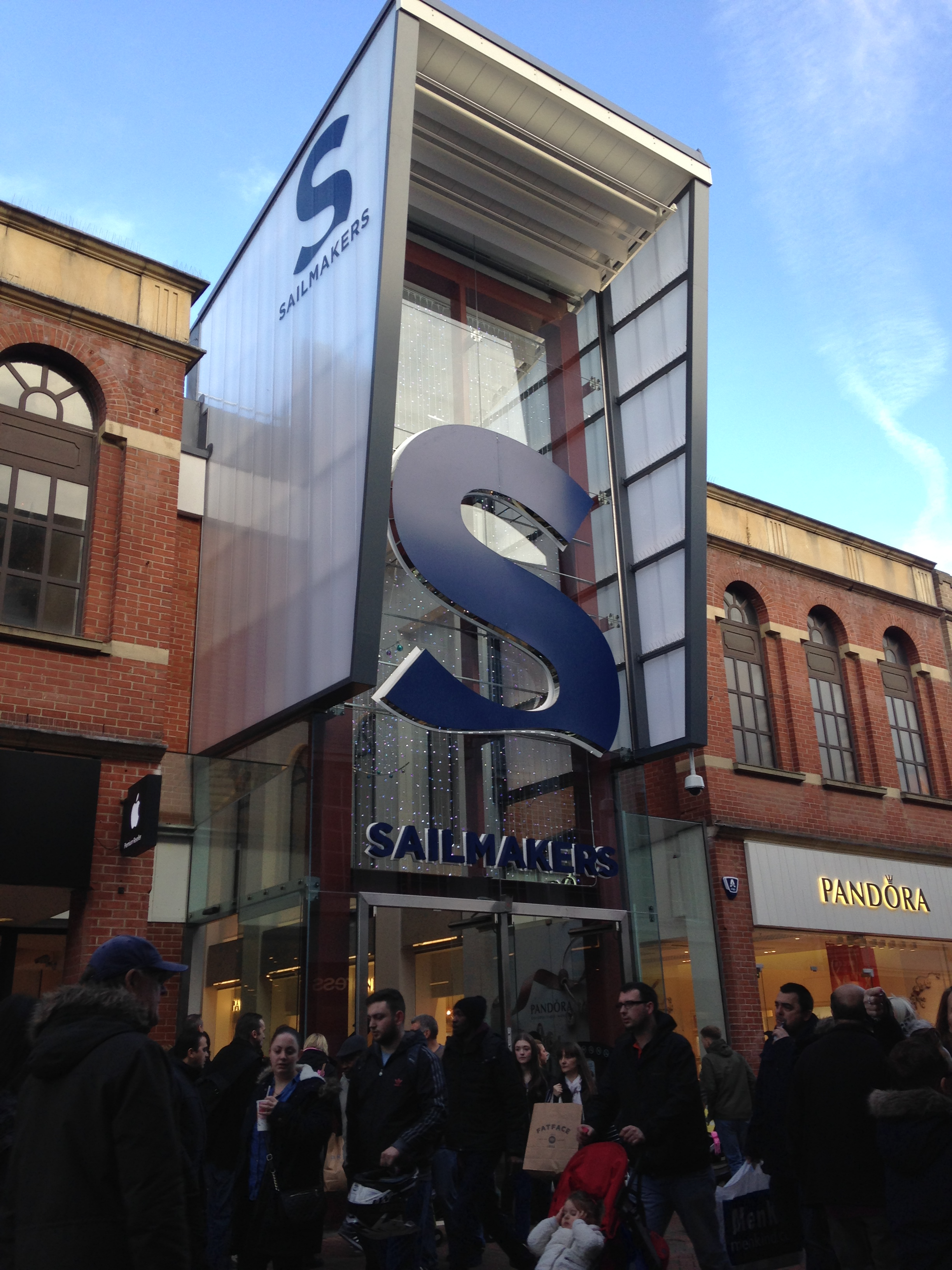
Sailmakers Shopping Centre (High street entrance)

Sailmakers shopping centre (formerly known as Tower Ramparts) is a small multi-story shopping centre located in Ipswich, England. It was opened to the public in November 1986. It is currently owned and operated by LaSalle Investment Management, who purchased the centre in 2011.

== Transformation ==
In July 2014, LaSalle Investment Management and Ipswich Borough Council announced to the public the plans for a £4 million transformation of the shopping centre. It was further announced that Barnes Construction Group would be the contractors for the transformation. The shopping centre reopened in late November 2015 under the new identity of Sailmakers Shopping Centre.
