= Cornmill Stream and Old River Lea =

Protected area in Essex, England

Coordinates: 51.6934°N 0.0053°W

- Site of Special Scientific Interest
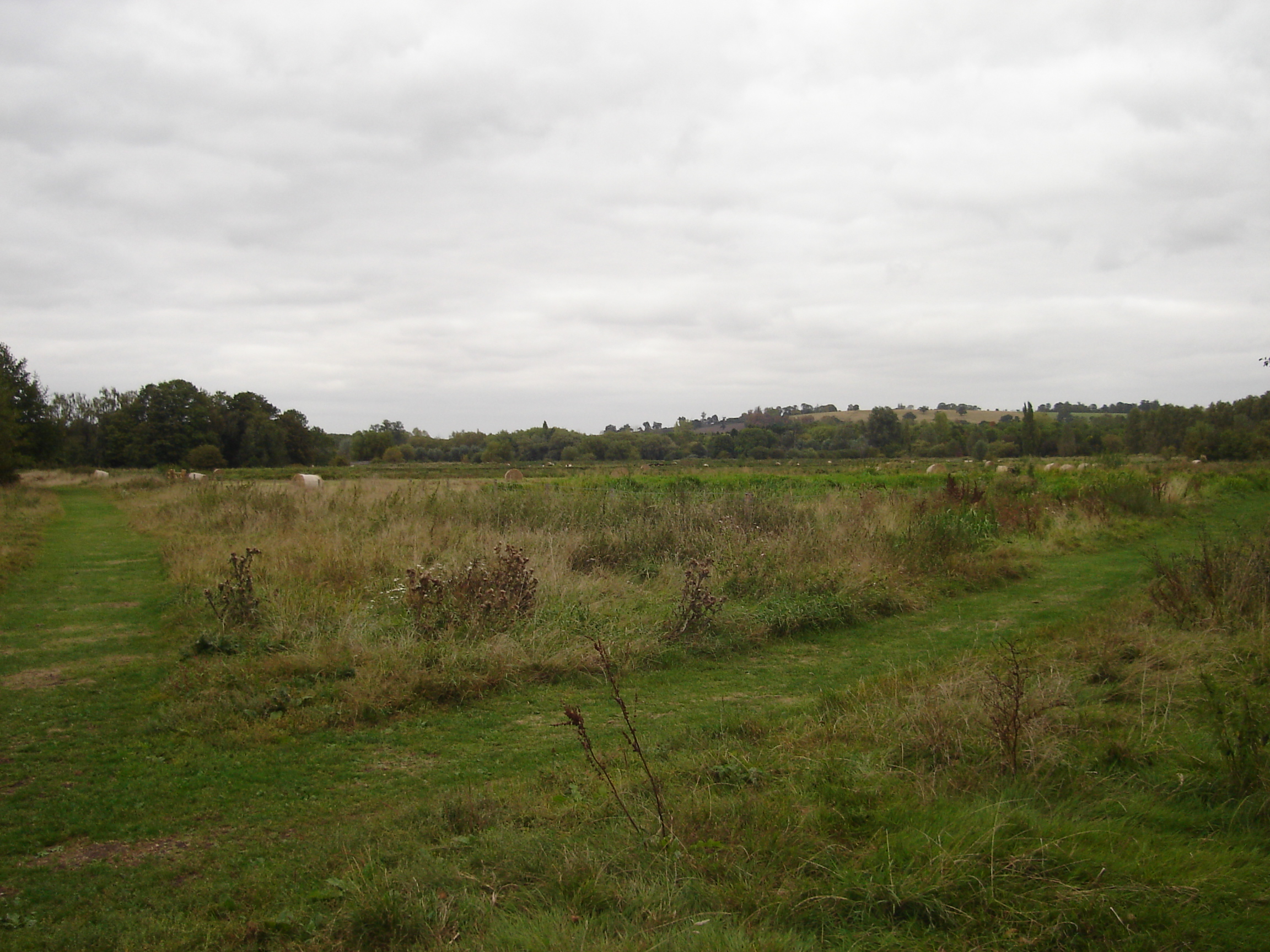
- Location of Cornmill Stream and Old River Lea.
- Area of search: Essex
- Grid reference: TL380013
- Interest: Biological
- Area: 24.6 ha (61 acres)
- Notification date: 1986
- Location map: Magic Map

The Cornmill Stream and Old River Lea is a 24.6-hectare (61-acre) biological Site of Special Scientific Interest in Waltham Abbey, Essex.

== Location ==
The site is bounded by a channel of the Old River Lea to the north and west which formed a boundary with the former Royal Gunpowder Mills. To the east flows the Cornmill Stream and the southern boundary is formed by the B194 road (Abbey View).

== Habitat ==
The slow-moving Cornmill Stream and Old River Lea form a freshwater habitat with one of the most diverse invertebrate fauna in Essex. Eighteen species of dragonflies and damselflies have been recorded and includes the uncommon and nationally declining white-legged damselfly. The watercourses support a rich and varied aquatic and marginal flora and the site also includes rough grassland which provides feeding and breeding grounds for invertebrates and birds.
