= Castle Place Shopping Centre =

- Location: Trowbridge, Wiltshire, England
- Coordinates: 51.3196°N 2.2071°W
- Website: www.castleplacetrowbridge.com

Castle Place Shopping Centre is a shopping centre in Trowbridge, England.

The shopping centre was purchased by Legal & General Property in 2010. In 2011, it was refurbished.

In May 2023, the shopping centre was sold at auction for £1.2 million.
