= Kennedy Centre, Belfast =

Kennedy Centre
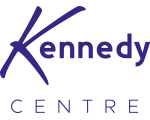
- Location: Belfast, Northern Ireland
- Coordinates: 54.5809°N 5.9788°W
- Address: 564 - 568 Falls Road, Belfast, BT11 9AE
- Opened: 1981 (Curleys); 1991 (Mall)
- Developer: HJS developments
- Manager: John Jones
- Owner: Hugh Kennedy and Family
- Architect: HPA
- Num. of stores: 48
- Num. of anchor tenants: 1
- Floor area: 300,000 sq ft (28,000 m^{2})
- Floors: 3
- Parking: 800
- Website: kennedycentre.co.uk

Kennedy Centre is a retail and leisure development in a largely built-up residential area in West Belfast. Having agreed upon a new anchor tenant, the Kennedy Centre was redeveloped again in 2009 with a new cinema, an expanded supermarket and entertainment complex. At approximately 97,000 sq ft (9,000 m^{2}). Its anchor tenant is Sainsbury's supermarket, its largest supermarket in Northern Ireland.

== History ==
The site was formerly a Lucozade factory, in which Hugh Kennedy bought, developed, and opened his supermarket, named "Curleys" in 1981, on the site. It was later redeveloped in 1991 by Kennedy as the "Kennedy Centre".

In 2008, supermarket chain Sainsbury's acquired the Curleys supermarket business. This led to a remodelling and rebranding of the supermarket area of the shopping centre, leading to a Sainsbury's store that is approximately 97,000 sq ft (9,000 m^{2}), making it their flagship Sainsbury's supermarket in Northern Ireland. There is also a Sainsbury's petrol filling station and two concessions; an Argos concession and a SushiGourmet counter on the site.

As part of the expansion of the Kennedy Centre, a new O'Neills store, a refurbished cinema now operated by Omniplex Cinemas and an entertainment complex, would all be created.

In 2022, Home Bargains left the main building and moved to a large building next to Kennedy Centre in the same complex. A Tim Hortons drive thru opened outside the centre the same year. This led to Poundland opening in the old unit that used to be Home Bargains.

== Retail stores ==
Within the Kennedy Centre, there are currently 49 stores. Some of these stores include Iceland, Costa Coffee, Greggs and JD Sports. Other stores include Boots, Peacocks, O'Neills and DV8. Post-remodelling, the Kennedy Centre now hosts a foodcourt in the upstairs area, a children's soft play area and cafe known as Roar & Explore and a family entertainment complex. The Andersonstown Jobs and Benefits office is also located within the complex.

On the first floor of the Kennedy Centre, there is an 8-screen digital cinema operated by Omniplex Cinemas.
