= Lion Walk =

Coordinates: 51.8891°N 0.9°E

Lion Walk Shopping Centre

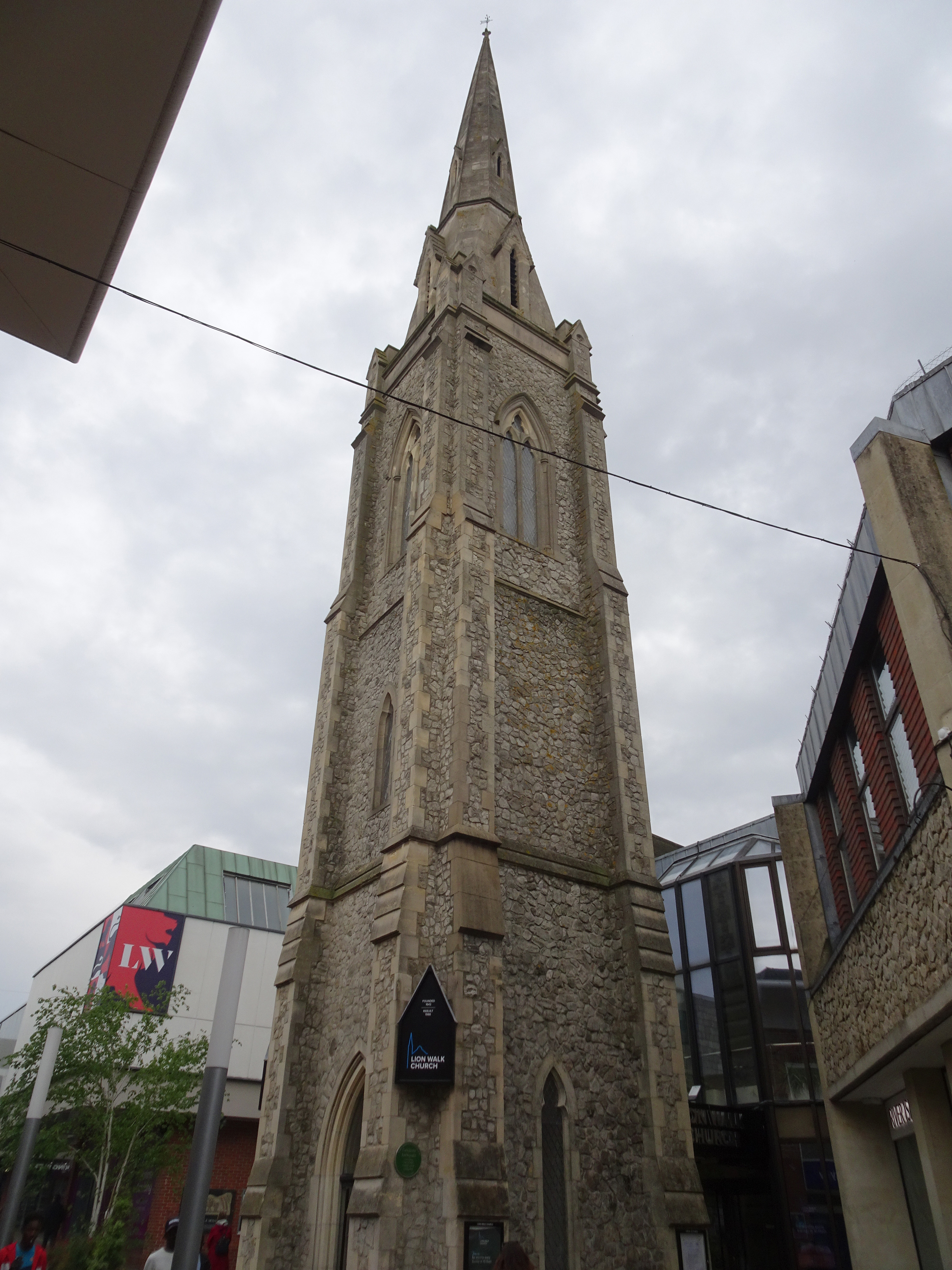
- The United Reformed church located in the mall
- Location: Central Colchester, Essex
- Opened: 1976
- Manager: Lambert Smith Hampton
- Owner: Lion Walk Property S.A.R.L.
- Num. of stores: 44
- Floors: 2 (some shops have extra floors)
- Website: lionwalkshopping.com

Lion Walk Shopping Centre, or simply Lion Walk is the largest and primary outdoor mall in Colchester, Essex.

A route from Eld Lane to the Red Lion inn, originally called Cat Lane, has existed since at least 1748, and has been known as Lion Walk since 1957. Archaeological excavations on the site in the early 1970s uncovered Roman-era artefacts, including mosaic floors—one of which depicted a walking lion.

Housing in the area was demolished to create space for the shopping centre which opened in 1976: of the older buildings, only the tower of the congregational church was retained (dating from 1863, with the spire rebuilt after an earthquake in 1884). The centre underwent a £20 million revamp in 2009, which included removing a bridge that once linked units in Culver Street East and Culver Walk.

In March 2025, the Shopping Centre reported 100% occupancy.
