= Houndshill Shopping Centre =

Coordinates: 53.8164°N 3.0533°W

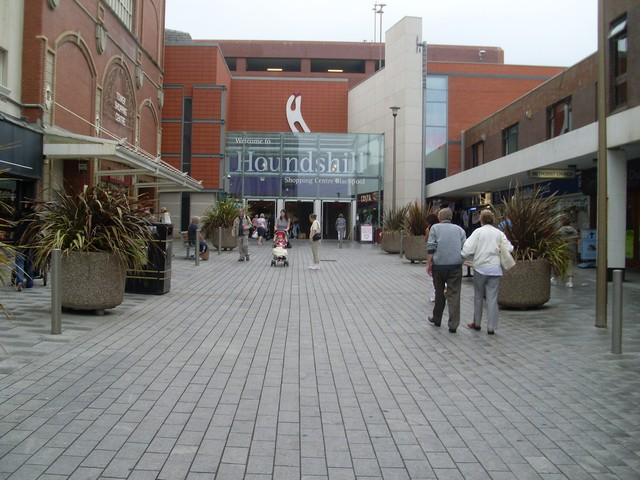
- Location: Blackpool, Lancashire, England
- Opened: 1980s
- Developer: Modus Properties
- Owner: Blackpool Council
- Num. of stores: 55+
- Num. of anchor tenants: 5
- Floors: 1
- Parking: 770
- Website: www.houndshillshoppingcentre.co.uk

Houndshill Shopping Centre is an indoor shopping centre in Blackpool, Lancashire, England. It is located in the centre of the town, with one entrance located opposite Blackpool Tower on Bank Hey Street.

== History ==
Construction on Houndshill began in 1978. A car park was also constructed above the shopping centre, spanning over 4 floors. It is the only indoor shopping centre in Blackpool.

In September 2008, a new extension was opened at a cost of over £30million; the extension featured Debenhams as the new flagship store and trebled the size of the shopping centre. The multistory car park was also expanded.

In 2019, the owners of Houndshill, BCC Eiffel went into receivership, putting the future of the centre into doubt; It was bought by Blackpool Council soon after for £47million.

== Stores ==
Stores within Houndshill include: JD, Next, Yours Clothing, Jack & Jones, River Island, Costa Coffee, New Look, Build-A-Bear Workshop, Deichmann, Footasylum, Superdrug, Pandora.
