= Cwmbran Centre =

M Cwmbran Cwmbran Centre
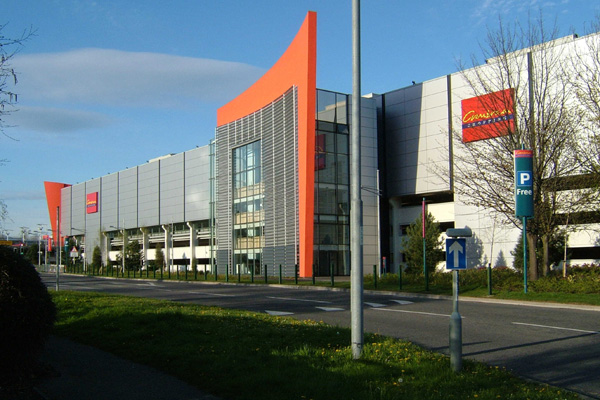
- The Llewelyn Walk entrance
- Location: Cwmbran, Torfaen, Wales
- Coordinates: 51.65354°N 3.02139°W
- Opened: 1959
- Owner: M Core
- Num. of anchor tenants: 7
- Parking: 3,000
- Website: www.cwmbrancentre.com

The Cwmbran Centre, renamed M Cwmbran from March 2024, is a shopping centre, office and leisure complex in the town of Cwmbran, Torfaen, Wales. It was formerly named Cwmbran Shopping, then renamed Cwmbran Centre on 3 July 2017.

As a New Town in 1949 the town centre was planned in a single Master Plan along with the surrounding residential neighbourhoods. It is the second largest shopping centre in Wales.

== History ==
The Cwmbran Development Corporation prepared the Master Plan for the development of the New Town which resulted in the creation of the original seven neighbourhoods which contained some local services, and housing and were located within easy reach of the Town Centre. The early years of the New Town were dominated by housebuilding with a lack of services for the town. In 1959 construction of the central retail area began, although considerations of its design began in 1951. The Town Centre was developed as a purpose-built central area by the Development Corporation and the Town Centre has been the focal point for retail development in Torfaen since its inception as a New Town.

North Walk and Gwent Square were the first area to be constructed. General Rees Square, which housed the South Wales Electricity Board and Post Office, was named after General Wynford Rees (1898-1959), a Commander of the British Indian Army, Deputy Lieutenant of Monmouthshire and First Manager of the Cwmbran Development Corporation. In 1964, David Evans opened – this was the largest department store in the area at the time. From 1967 to 1972 the town centre grew at speed, with the opening of the Tower, Glyndwr, Monmouth and Gwent Houses, Monmouth Square and the Water Garden, the cinema, theatre, social club, police station and Magistrate's Court.

Flagship stores followed; Woolco in 1975 (now Llewelyn Walk), Sainsbury's in 1976 (relocated in 1994, original site now Asda) and Marks and Spencer in 1977 (closed in 2019). The bingo hall in Monmouth Walk was the last building to be built in 1981 before the centre was sold to Ladbrokes in 1985. Transport links improved by the re-opening of Cwmbran Railway Station in 1986 and Cwmbran Drive in 1988, allowing the centre to develop outside the original ringroad. In the 1990s, Lockgate Retail Park opened to the west of the centre, on derelict land once used by Guest, Keen & Nettlefold, and Aldi and Lidl opened in Forgehammer. In 2013, Morrisons opened to the east of the centre, on land once used by Girlings.

In January 2022, the centre was purchased from M&G Real Estate by LCP.

== Present day ==
Cwmbran Centre is now owned by LCP Group and houses some of the most famous High Street shops in the UK. The largest unit is occupied by Asda, opened in 2001 on the former site of J. Sainsbury's, Swalec, and the health centre.

The Torfaen Sixth Form Centre, which is one of the five campuses of Coleg Gwent, was opened in September 2020, on land between Morrisons and Meritor (formerly Girlings). A McDonald's drive-thru has also been planned within the Morrisons car park, and Lidl is to be relocated to the Stagecoach depot site on Somerset Road, which is moving to new premises north of the industrial estate.

Plans have also been submitted for the refurbishment of Gwent and Monmouth Squares, having been untouched since their construction in the 1970s.
