= Rugby Central Shopping Centre =

Shopping precinct in Warwickshire, England

Coordinates: 52.3730°N 1.2630°W

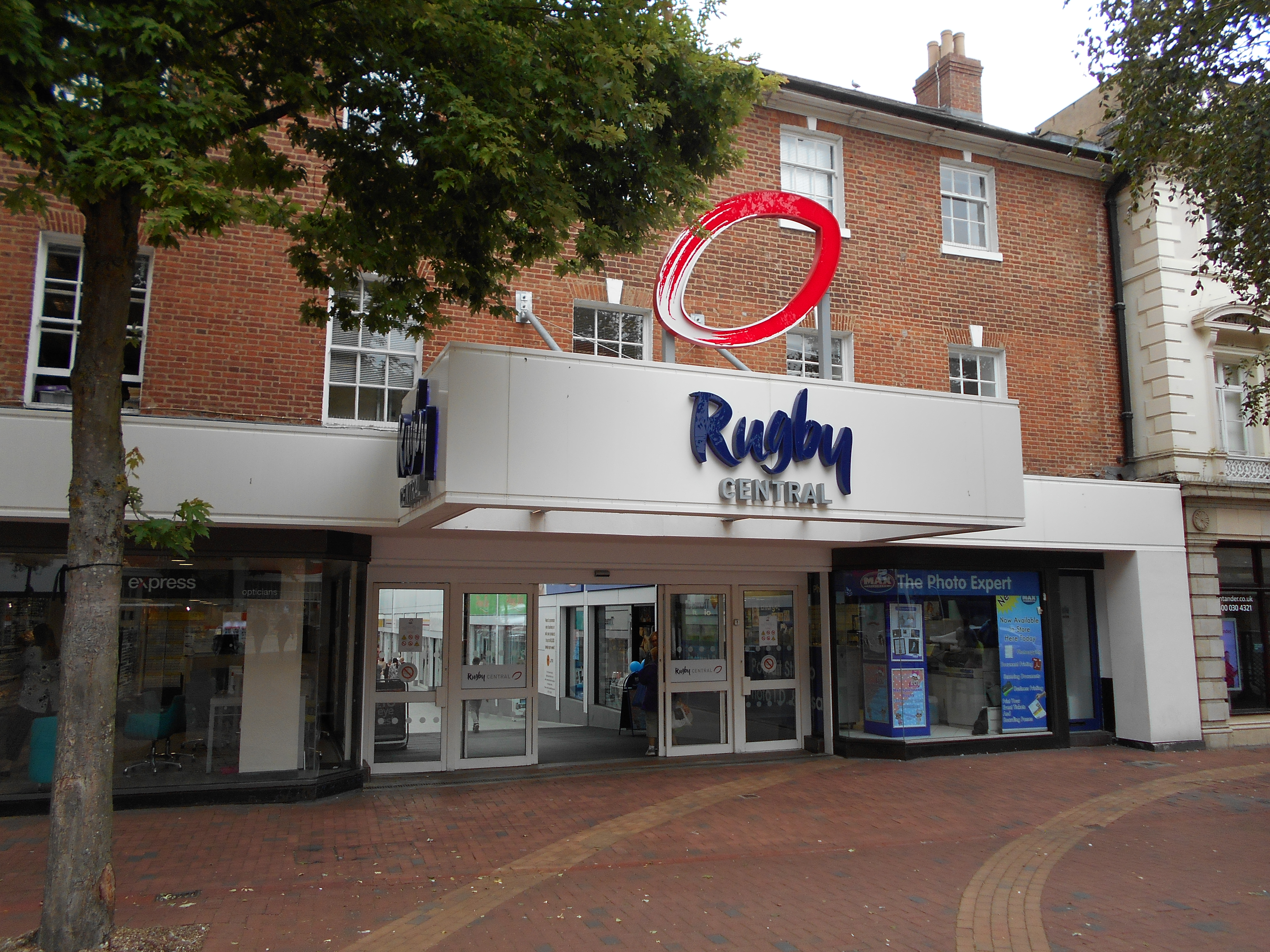
Main entrance from Market Place.

The Rugby Central Shopping Centre is a two-storey shopping precinct in the town centre of Rugby, Warwickshire, England, managed by CBGA Robson LLP. The precinct includes clothes stores, game shops, thrift stores and food outlets. There is a large multi-storey car park at the rear and the towns main bus stops are at the front of the centre. The centre is visited by 100,000 people per week, and has more than 50 outlets.

The precinct, originally opened in 1979, as "Rugby Shopping Centre", changed its name in 1995 to "Clock Towers Shopping Centre" after the clock tower in the town centre, and adapted its name as a theme; the shopping centre features clocks and other time-related decorations, the precinct installed two ornamental clocks, both loosely based on the traditional grandfather clock design. The first, named Chiming Clock, was designed to chime and play music on the hour and half-hour as a tortoise and hare raced around the dials, reenacting Aesop's fable.

It took on its current name in October 2017.
