= Fairhill Shopping Centre =

Shopping centre in Ballymena, Northern Ireland

Coordinates: 54.869°N 6.274°W

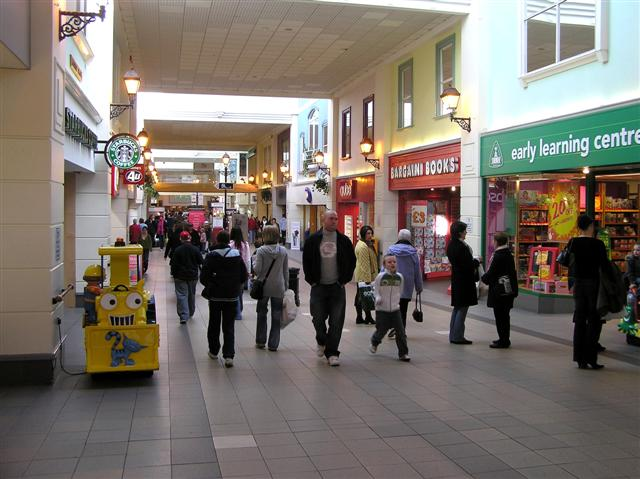

Fairhill Shopping Centre is a shopping centre located in Ballymena, County Antrim, Northern Ireland. It contains over 30 stores and a food court and has parking for over 1,100 cars in a multi-storey car park. It is open Monday to Wednesday and Saturday from 9:00am to 6:00pm, while on Thursday and Friday it is open from 9:00am to 9:00pm. Anchor tenants include Primark, Next, New Look and Marks & Spencer.

== History ==
Fairhill opened in 1991, its anchor tenants included Co-op and Marks & Spencer. During the years, M&S expanded its store, Co-op closed its store in 2002 with BHS and a subsidiary of Arcadia Group opening in its former space.

In 2007, Debenhams opened its first Desire fashion store in the centre. In the same year, the upstairs of the centre became a food court.

The former landlords of the Centre, Corbo Ltd, confirmed in 2009 that BHS would be closing, the unit would undergo redevelopment before being handed over to Next and New Look. Both stores opened in the same year.

In 2021, Debenhams closed down its store in the centre. In the same year, property groups Magell and Melcorpo Group acquired the centre from Patrizia SE.

in 2023, it was confirmed that Primark would open a store in the centre, part of the centre (which housed retailers like former anchor Debenhams and retailers such as River Island) was demolished to house the retailer, downsizing the centre's store space slightly and losing an entrance. The store opened on 5 December 2025, relocating from the nearby Tower Centre.

In February 2025, it was announced that the centre would be receiving a £10m revamp in preparation for Primark opening, removing the high street theme of the centre and making it more modern, a rebrand and new stores were also announced.

== Rail access ==
- Ballymena
