= Miller Arcade =

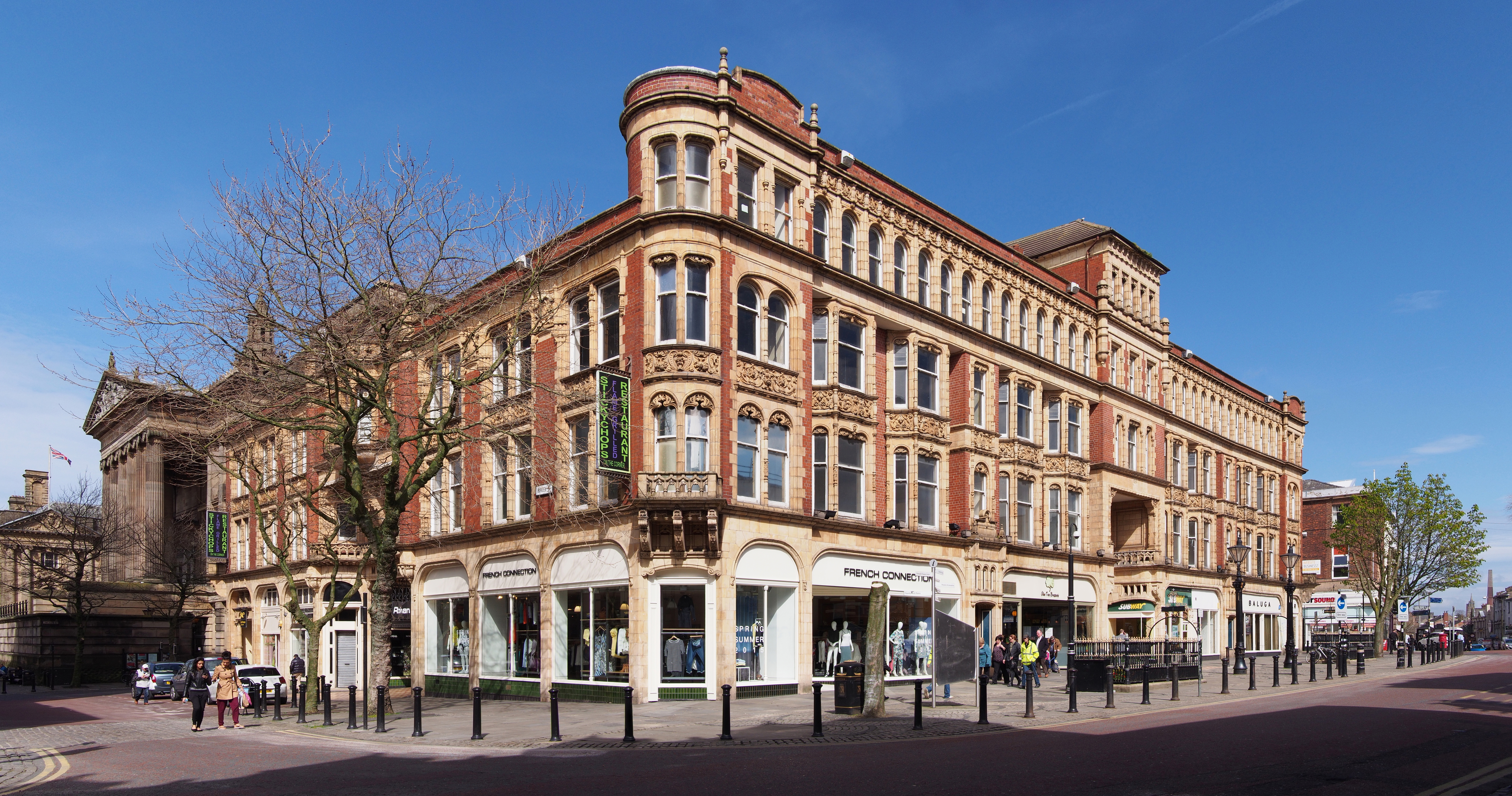

- Location within Preston city centre

General information
- Status: Active
- Type: Shopping centre
- Architectural style: Victorian
- Location: Preston, Lancashire, England
- Coordinates: 53.75866°N 2.69807°W
- Construction started: August 1896
- Opened: 1899; 127 years ago
- Owner: Callaway Estate Limited

Design and construction
- Architects: Edwin Bush & Nathanial Miller
- Designations

Listed Building – Grade II
- Designated: 27 September 1979
- Reference no.: 1292466

Miller Arcade is a Grade II listed shopping centre in Preston, Lancashire, England. The building was opened in 1899 and is located in Preston's city centre and is Preston's first indoor shopping centre. The building is modelled on a much larger shopping centre, Burlington Arcade, London.

== History ==
Miller Arcade was opened in 1899 and was modelled off the much larger Burlington Arcade, London and was designed by Edwin Bush who was working for the Birmingham based company Essen, Nichol and Goodman. Bush constructed the building on behalf of Nathanial Miller, a Preston dentist who in 1895 held a competition for the commission of his new building. Construction began in August 1896. The building replaced some old terraced houses and shops known as "The Shambles" that were owned by the Miller family who had previously failed to sell the area. The Shambles were built by the Molyneux family at the beginning of the eighteenth century. The building originally had pepper pot turrets on each corner but these had to be removed in the 1920s due to safety concerns. In addition to the shops, the building also included Victorian Turkish baths, originally leased to A[lfred] Arbury, opening on or around 14 January 1899, and remaining open under his successors until 1947. (Note: The baths were still open in 1946, but the contents of the baths were auctioned the following September.) The upper floors of the building were used as a hotel during the building's earlier years. There was also a room called "The Geisha Ballroom" within the building during its earlier years.

== Centre information and stores ==
Miller Arcade is a Victorian building with an Italian terracotta style facade. The architecture inside the centre is ornate tiling, vintage shop fronts and high-glass panelled ceilings. There are also some benches in the middle of the centre. The building has three storeys over the cellars along with an attic storey. The upper floors were previously occupied by a hotel. Historic England lists the floors as office space. However, these floors have been vacant for many years. As of present, the building is owned by Callaway Estate Limited.

The shops and eateries inside Miller Arcade include Rohan, Rise, Baluga Bar & Club, IceBurg, Smashed, Haute Dolci and Subway.

== Transport links ==
The centre is located on four roads, one on each face of the building. These are Church Street, Lancaster Road, Jacson Street and Birley Street. The centre is 260 metres (280 yd) from Preston bus station and 660 metres (720 yd) from Preston railway station.

== Popular culture ==
Miller Arcade featured in the 1962 film "A Kind of Loving" during the scene where Vic (Alan Bates) and Ingrid (June Richie) meet outside Lavell's sweet and tobacco kiosk, a shop which was formerly a part of the arcade.

== See also ==
- Listed buildings in Preston, Lancashire
