= Ropewalk Shopping Centre =

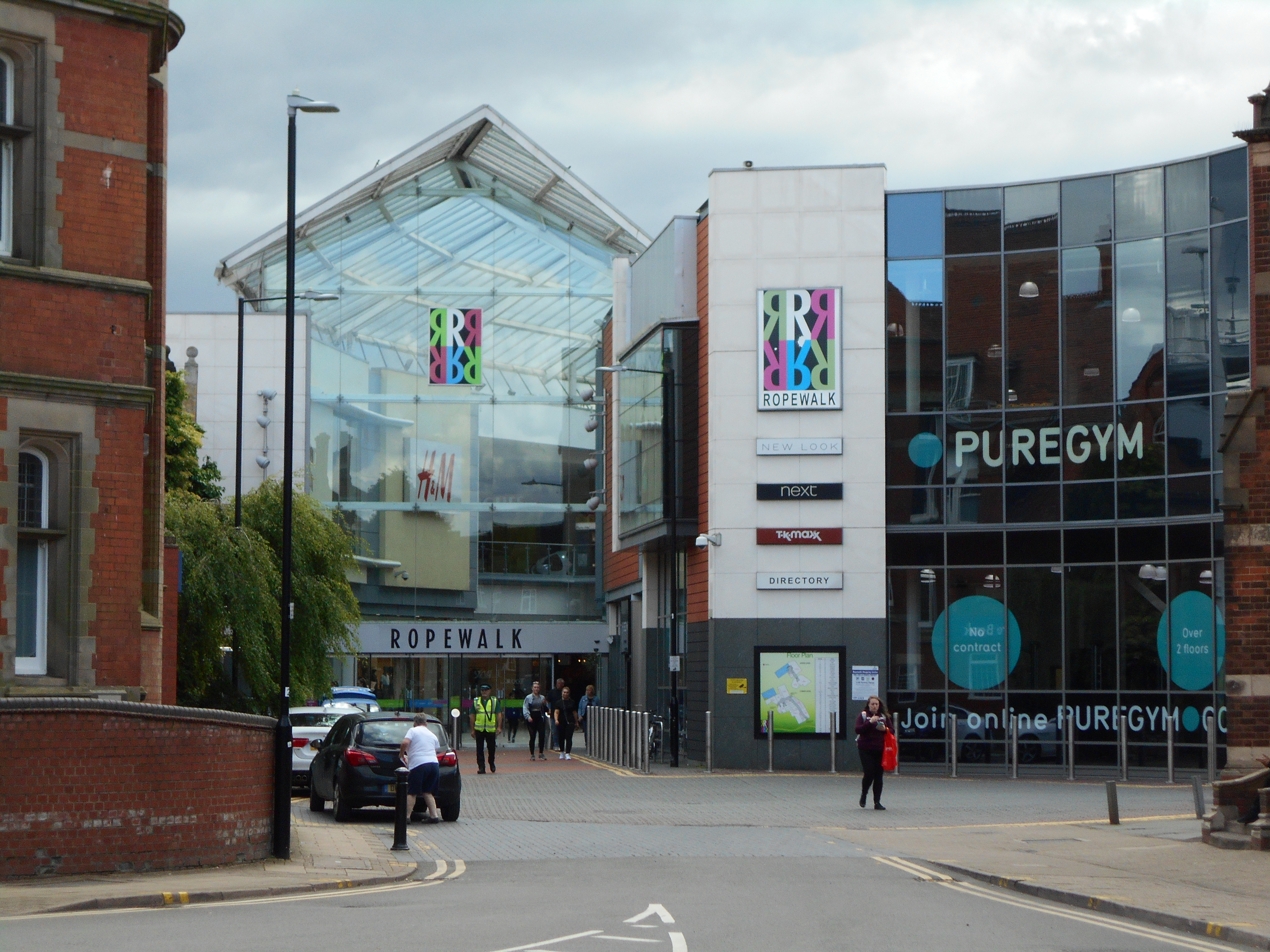
- A main entrance to the Ropewalk Shopping Centre in 2019
- Location: Nuneaton, Warwickshire, England
- Coordinates: 52.5218°N 1.4695°W
- Address: Chapel Street
- Opened: 1 September 2005
- Manager: Bank of Ireland
- Owner: Unknown
- Floor area: 185,000 square feet (17,200 m^{2})
- Floors: 2
- Parking: Car park (520 parking spaces)
- Website: ropewalknuneaton.co.uk

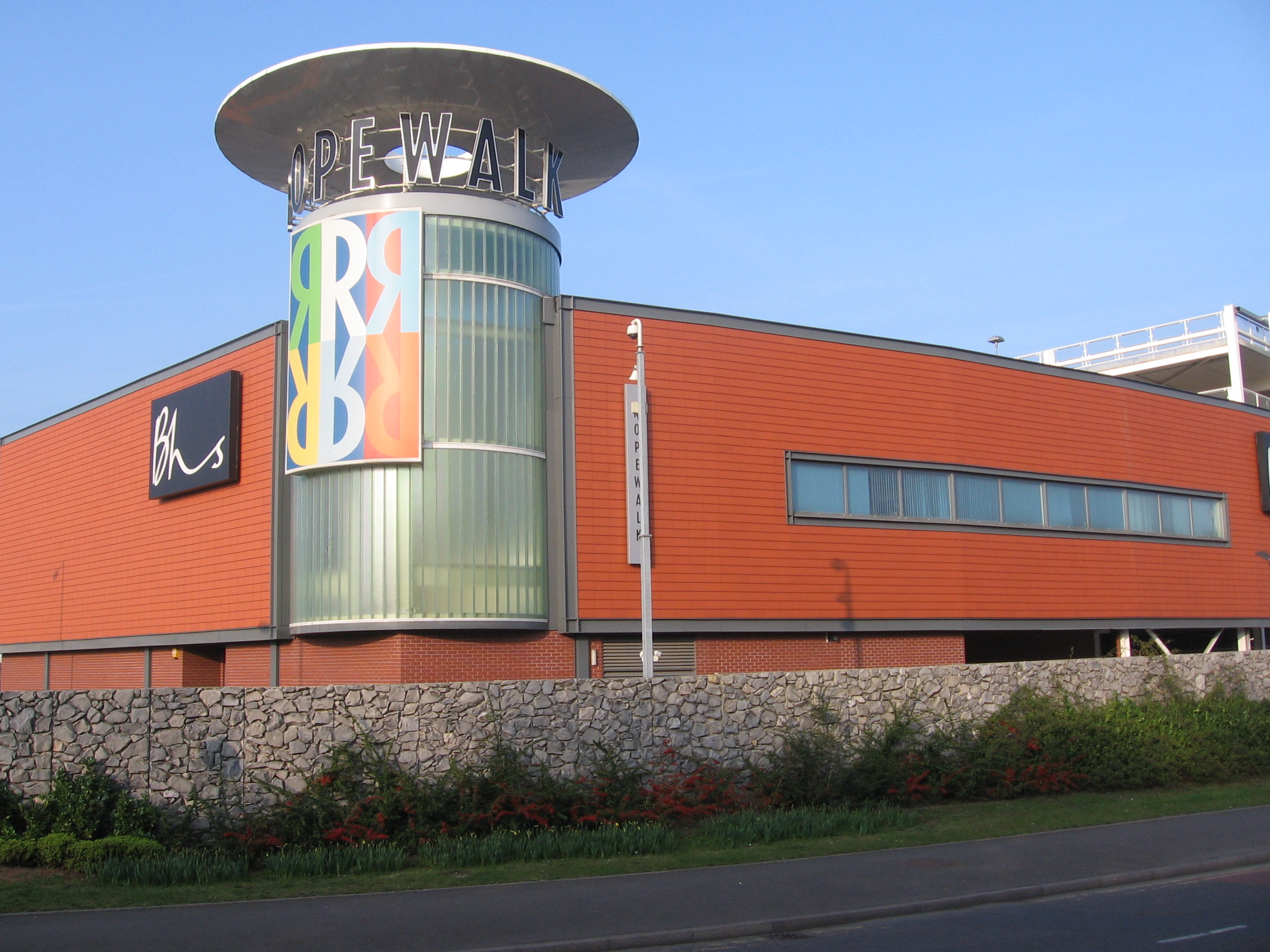
Side view of the Ropewalk as it appeared in 2009.

The Ropewalk Shopping Centre is a shopping centre in Nuneaton, Warwickshire, England. It has a glass roof (which is not connected to the building), two floors retail stores, including high street retailers, and also a car park.

== History and impact ==
The Ropewalk Shopping Centre started life as the Queens Arcade. For many years, the Queens Arcade was ageing and needed replacing, with many store units lying vacant or occupied by small, independent businesses.

In 2001, Nuneaton and Bedworth Borough Council decided to replace the arcade with a new shopping centre. An early design of a shopping centre with three floors, a bowling alley and a cinema was rejected by the Council, who in turn accepted a plan to build a Cinema and Bowling Alley in Bermuda Park, Nuneaton.

However, in 2003 and another redesign to the plan, a new scheme was submitted and received planning consent from the council. It included the plan to demolish the Queens Arcade for an all new modern shopping centre to be erected on land which was covered by the Queens Arcade and the Dugdale Car Parks and see the Shopping Centre slicing Dugdale Street in half. The project cost £60 million and was constructed between 2004 and 2005. The Main Shopping Centre also saw a 5 Storey 500 car parking spaces Car Park built next to it which is run by Nuneaton and Bedworth Borough Council, this was built first to compensate the loss of car parking spaces due to the Shopping Centre's construction.

Nuneaton and Bedworth Borough Council owns the site that the Centre was built on and has the site leased out for 150 years.

The centre has now been trading since 1 September 2005. One major contract, which the Ropewalk helped bring to Nuneaton, was the arrival of American coffee giant Starbucks. The coffeehouse opened its outlet (next to Marks and Spencer) on 4 June 2007. However, its tenure was short-lived and Starbucks left Nuneaton in 2009.

In 2008 and 2009, The Ropewalk lost main business as the recession took hold, with Woolworths and Barratt Shoes closing up their stores, Blue Inc took over Barratt's Unit but the Woolworths Store was left empty.

In January 2010, the Bank of Ireland took control of the shopping Centre after previous owners called Broadway Capital owned by Irish Investor and Property Developer John McCann were liquidated with debts of up to £64 million, most of that money was owed to the BOI. BTW Shields was appointed by the Bank to run the Shopping Centre on its behalf, however this new management has stressed that the Shopping Centre is open for business as usual. The Bank of Ireland said they will run the Shopping Centre for the moment before selling it off.

In October 2010, the former Woolworths unit was taken over by TJ Hughes, who created 113 jobs for the town, which seen the Council spend £2.6 million on renovating the unit and building a lift and escalators for the retailer.

In August 2011, TJ Hughes had given up the former Woolworths unit. The space was later taken on by 99p Stores but this became a Poundland when the companies merged. Poundland then moved round the corner and was replaced by KE6 college.

On 5 October 2017, TJ Hughes returned to Nuneaton, but this time inside of the Ropewalk, occupying the former BHS premises. They remained in this unit until they left in 2020.
