= Thistles Centre =

Shopping centre in Stirling, Scotland

Coordinates: 56.117°N 3.934°W

The Thistles Shopping Centre
- Location: Stirling, Forth Valley, Scotland
- Address: Goosecroft Road, Stirling
- Opened: 1977; 1997 (Thistles Marches extension)
- Owner: AXA Investment Managers
- Num. of stores: 87
- Num. of anchor tenants: 4
- Floor area: 2
- Parking: 2 floors

The Thistles Shopping Centre is located in Stirling, Scotland. The shopping centre caters for over 500,000 sq ft of retail, providing 87 units in total, since opening in 1977.

== Thistles Marches ==
A new phase, known as Thistle II Ltd, was financed by three joint ventures being Stirling Council (49%), John Laing Property (49%) and DepFa Bank (2%). A new 970 two-storey car park, 14 stance bus station, 40 new units within the new phase and the creation of 400 jobs was the focus of the plans. The Thistle Marches opened to the public in September 1997, retaining Stirling's importance as the major regional centre outwith the main cities.

Standard Life Investments eventually bought the entire shopping centre in 1998 for £37.2 million, at least a year after the Thistles Marches phase was complete. The company paid £8 million back to the finances for their contributions.

As The Thistle Centre stands now, it has well over 500,000 sq ft of retail space; its position in the heart of Stirling allows for a catchment area of over 500,000 people within 20 km of the centre. It is estimated that the centre currently attracts over 12 million visitors per year, with 3.7 million likely to be tourists from other countries.

The Thistles Centre forms part of the Go Forth Stirling Business Improvement District.

== Stores ==
The anchor stores are Marks & Spencer and Primark. Other major stores include Superdry, River Island, CeX, H. Samuel, Boots, WHSmith, Ernest Jones, Sainsbury's Local and HMV.

Several of the centre's stores closed in 2021 as a result of the COVID-19 pandemic. This included Zara, Topshop, H&M, and anchor tenant Debenhams.

== Thieves Pot ==
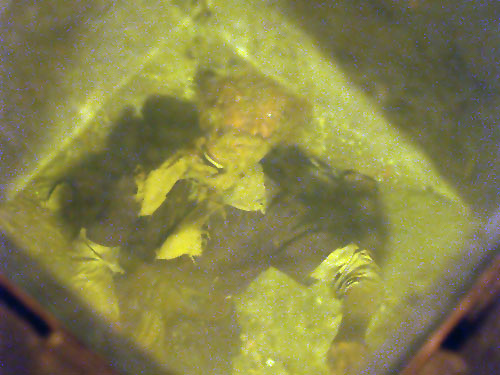
The thief inside the Thieves Pot

The shopping centre has a 16th-century jail with an extensive history of the Bastion's. The jail is of historical importance in Stirling, being used at one time to guard an angle of Stirling's Town Wall.

The Thieves Pot is accessed within the Thistles Centre itself, located near the Port Street entrance. The Thieves Pot is identified by two 'flaming' torches on the wall because a visitor could mistake this for a themed bar. However this is actually the entrance to the underground jail. Entering through the opening in the wall, the visitor must first travel down a wrought iron spiral staircase. As the visitor descends the feeling of entering a different time sets in, as the surroundings change from the busy shopping centre into a confined jail environment.

Admission to the Thieves Pot is free, and can be visited whenever the shopping centre is open.

Looking around a visitor will see a circular rough stone room, this is the original guardroom which existed in the walls which used to defend Stirling. The guardroom which the visitor enters into contains different artefacts; including Justice Figure and Stirling Heads which are placed as historical presentations, giving information on the room and the history of what happened there. There is also the Thieves Pot below this room, this was the prison where people would be sent as a jail. This is a dark cramped space, also known as an oubliette, which is viewable through a glass floor panel and contains a model representation of a prisoner down in the prison. The entrance to this prison space would originally have been accessed through a trapdoor which would have been present where the glass viewing panel now is in the floor.
