= Eden Shopping Centre =

- Location: High Wycombe, Buckinghamshire, England
- Coordinates: 51.6275°N 0.7530°W
- Opened: 13 March 2008; 18 years ago
- Developer: Multiplex and Aldersgate Investments
- Manager: Donaldson's
- Num. of stores: 107 Retail Units (54 new, 53 re-sited)
- Num. of anchor tenants: 4
- Floor area: 850,000 square feet (79,000 m^{2})
- Floors: 4
- Parking: 1,600
- Website: edenshopping.co.uk

The Eden Shopping Centre, commonly known as Eden, is a shopping and entertainment complex in High Wycombe, Buckinghamshire in the south east of England. With a floor area of 850,000 square feet (79,000 m^{2}), it is the 37th largest shopping centre in the United Kingdom and the largest in the surrounding area.

The centre has 107 shops, a bowling alley, a cinema, a library (which opened on 3 June 2008), 48 residential flats and parking for 1,600 cars on site with other car parks available nearby. The complex includes a bus station which opened in July 2006 followed by the shopping centre on 13 March 2008.

Construction of the centre formed a key part of the major regeneration of High Wycombe in a bid to transform the town into a regional shopping destination. Eden attracted one million visitors within two weeks of opening and regularly attracts over 350,000 visitors per week.

== History ==
=== Background ===
Eden formed part of a multi-million programme of investment to transform the town. In 1991, the area later occupied by Eden was known as 'the western desert', and Wycombe District Council placed improving it as a top priority.

Before the construction of Eden, the town centre of High Wycombe contained two shopping centres, the Octagon Centre and the Chilterns Shopping Centre. The Octagon, officially opened by Katharine, Duchess of Kent on 6 October 1970, had become dated and was incorporated into the redevelopment. High Wycombe has a population of 120,257 people and the town centre was not much of an attraction, with shops spread out over a large area. Moreover, the town was seen as being overshadowed by nearby towns with larger shopping centres, such as the Queensmere Observatory (Slough), King Edward Court (Windsor), the Oracle (Reading), the Chimes (Uxbridge), Harlequin Shopping Centre (Watford) and Central Milton Keynes Shopping Centre (Milton Keynes).

A new shopping centre was agreed to rejuvenate the town. The development was known as Western Sector, Project Phoenix and TCR (town centre redevelopment), until the name "Eden" was announced at the annual meeting of Wycombe District Council on 9 May 2005. This name was recommended by marketing consultants DS Emotion, who had been appointed to choose an appropriate name for the development. Letters written to local newspaper Bucks Free Press revealed a mixed reaction to the name: some readers felt that it was unrelated to local culture and not inclusive for High Wycombe's ethnic community, but others approved of the name and remarked on the sense of calm it evoked.

The new shopping centre would include a new bus station, library, cinema, bowling alley and 48 residential flats.

=== Construction ===
The bid for the contract was won by Stannifer, the construction arm of Multiplex UK. Despite some initial uncertainty when it emerged that Multiplex UK was in financial difficulties related to its rebuilding project at Wembley Stadium, the construction work began in September 2005. Construction was scheduled to begin on 5 September, but there was a delay due to incomplete paperwork, and building work began properly on 30 September. Demolition work started in August, beginning with the Iceland supermarket.

The site for the new complex was to be just south of Oxford Road, a dual carriageway section of the A40 on two flat car parks. The centre would also extend over the site of the old bus station and combine the existing Octagon Centre, which would be merged into the new centre.

The Tesco store remained in position throughout, after the company challenged a compulsory purchase order made by Wycombe District Council in 1997 that had been confirmed by the then Secretary of State for the Environment, Transport and the Regions, John Prescott. The result was that the new centre was built around it.

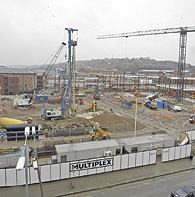
Eden Centre under construction (3 March 2006)

Construction of the new shopping centre began in October 2005 and was to take about two and a half years. While Eden was being built, the fencing around the site contained 'vision holes' so that visitors could see the progress being made. Car parking in the town was affected by the works, as Bridge Street car park was closed. Some roads were also closed or partly closed.

A new multi-storey car park was built to connect with the existing Newlands Car Park which was refurbished. The old bus station which had been viewed as dangerous at night due to poor lighting was replaced by a new 18-bay station with direct access to the shops. This opened in July 2006.

In November 2007, a time capsule was buried underneath the public square of the shopping centre. Various items were placed in the capsule, which is not expected to be dug up for fifty years.

=== Opening ===
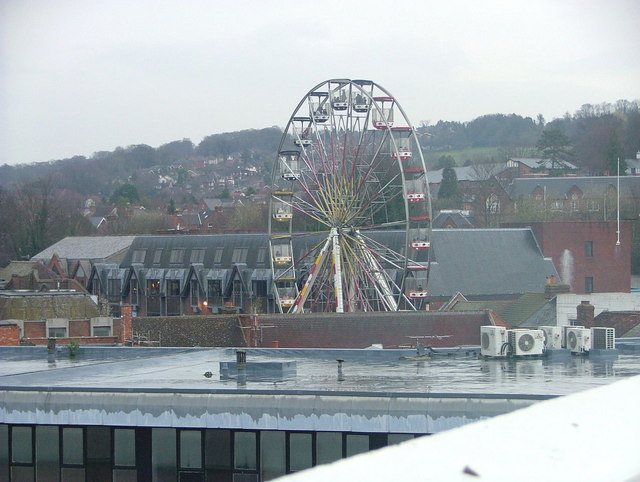
Ferris wheel erected to celebrate the centre's opening

Eden officially opened on 13 March 2008. Free rides on a large ferris wheel named the Wycombe Eye and carnival style celebrations were major parts of the opening ceremony. The actual opening ceremony involved a lone musician beginning in the high street, walking towards the new complex where he was joined by more musicians and dancers.

The opening ceremony was meant to represent the town's ethnic minorities and included lightly dressed dancers. Wycombe Islamic Society criticised the dress of some performers as being inappropriate.

The entertainment complex and library were officially opened on 9 July 2008 by Prince Edward, Earl of Wessex, who unveiled a plaque in the library.

Local newspaper the Bucks Free Press received many complaints about the design of the shopping centre, especially the fact that there is not a proper roof, resulting in the centre being compared to a 'wind tunnel'. This is disputable, as the designers had to work their way around the existing Tesco. However general response to the centre was positive, with the centre remaining very busy as of December 2021.

== Centre features ==
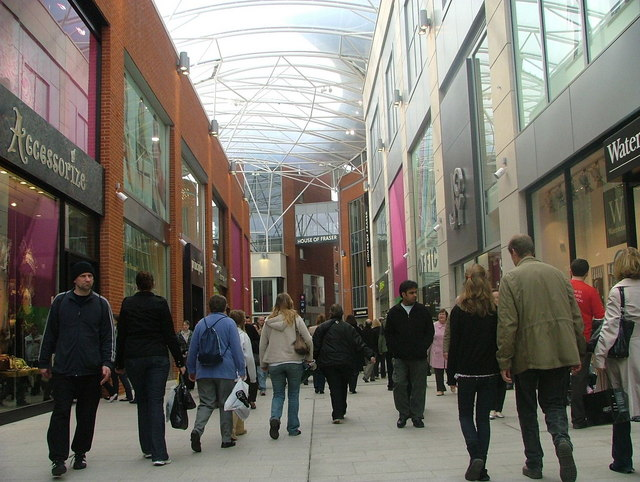
The centre on the first Saturday after opening

The shopping centre contains 107 shops, of which 54 were new to the town and 53 resited from elsewhere in the town. Currently, the largest store in use in the centre is the two story Marks & Spencer, which moved to Eden from the Chilterns Shopping Centre. The largest unit is the four storey unit previously occupied by House of Fraser until its closure on 12 January 2023. A Primark store was scheduled to occupy the first floor in early 2024. The complex has eleven restaurants and cafés. Additionally, the centre contains a 12-screen Cineworld cinema, a 22-lane Hollywood Bowl alley, a 58,000-book library, up from 45,000 books held at the old library. The library features step-free access.

Eden features a car park with 1,500 spaces and 48 residential apartments on the south side of the centre.

== Travel ==
=== Park and ride ===
A park and ride operates between High Wycombe Bus Station (adjoining the Eden Centre) and High Wycombe Coachway (part of the Handy Cross Hub) near junction 4 of the M40 motorway, which also serves the railway station and the hospital. The service began on 5 September 2005 and operates every 20-30 minutes during the day.

=== Rail ===
High Wycombe railway station, located near the High Street, is operated by Chiltern Railways with services to London Marylebone, Aylesbury and Birmingham Moor Street.

== Effect on the town centre ==
The Eden project formed part of a larger plan of regeneration, which resulted in other developments, including the development of a new enlarged Sainsbury's store facing onto Oxford Road.

In 2009, property consultants Colliers CRE conducted a survey of 15 towns and cities across the UK, which revealed that in October 2008 High Wycombe had the highest proportion of empty retail units, at 23.6 per cent. This was attributed to the joint impact of the recession and the opening of Eden, which had drawn many major retailers and shoppers out of other areas of the town.

=== High Street ===
High Street covered by snow in February 2007

The town centre of High Wycombe has gradually been moving west and the High Street is no longer the place for high-brand shops though it retains WHSmith, Boots and a McDonald's, amongst others so is still used by shoppers. The High Street and nearby streets are notable for containing the main banks like HSBC, TSB Bank, Metro Bank, Halifax and Barclays and it leads the way to the railway station. Supermarket Iceland, who was forced to leave their former site on Desborough Road in 2005 as part of the Eden shopping centre redevelopment, re-opened on the High Street in 2010, occupying the space that previously housed Woolworths.

=== Chilterns' Shopping Centre ===
The Chilterns' Shopping Centre was opened in the 1980s and is located only a short distance from Eden. With the opening of the Eden Centre, there was fear that business would be pulled away from the Chilterns', as shops such as Marks & Spencer and Wallis moved to Eden. However, the managers of the centre were more optimistic. In October 2004 it was announced that a major store would replace the Marks and Spencer, which was confirmed in February 2008 to be Primark. The new store opened on 1 October 2008.

Despite the earlier optimism, the centre began to empty gradually, with upper housing areas purchased by Buckinghamshire New University to convert into student accommodation. By December 2017, only five or so units occupied the twenty-nine unit site. The site was purchased by Dandara Homes in December 2017, and in May 2018, it was confirmed that Dandara would transform the centre into flats. In March 2019, Dandara Homes confirmed that they were still interested in converting it into flats, and were looking to work alongside the council to help improve the wider Frogmoor area. The remaining businesses in the centre were subsequently informed in late 2022 that their tenancies were set to expire in January 2024.

=== Elsewhere ===
The large out-of-town branch of John Lewis - situated off the Handy Cross roundabout on Holmers Farm Way - received some initial competition from Eden, especially House of Fraser, but store bosses were confident that John Lewis' reputation would enable it to retain customers. This has been more than borne out by the fact that in 2013 John Lewis refurbished and expanded the store to include clothing and other departments, incorporating some designer brands into their outfits. The House of Fraser store closed in January 2023.

== Events ==
Since August 2009, the shopping centre has held an annual food festival.

The centre was used as a filming location for the Black Mirror episode, "The Waldo Moment".
