= Cornmill Shopping Centre =

- Location: Darlington, England
- Coordinates: 54°31′32.4″N 1°33′13.3″W
- Address: Priestgate
- Opened: 1992; 34 years ago
- Manager: Susan Young
- Owner: Moorfield
- Num. of stores: Over 40
- Num. of anchor tenants: 1
- Floor area: 220,000 sq ft (20,000 m^{2})
- Floors: 2
- Parking: 402 spaces

Cornmill Shopping Centre (The Cornmill) is a shopping centre located on Priestgate in central Darlington, England. It is the main shopping centre in the town, with over 40 shops, including Primark (its anchor store), Next, HMV, Waterstone's, WHSmith and Tesco Express. The centre is set over two levels and covers over 220,000 sq ft (20,000 m^{2}). It also has a multi-storey car park with a 400 car capacity.

Food outlets include a number of independent traders, as well as Costa Coffee and Greggs.

== Site ==
The main centre comprises 58 retail units utilising a bridge link over Priestgate, creating one continuous mall at lower ground level and an additional lower ground retail floor. The property is freehold. It receives a weekly footfall of 125,000 people. Next, they pay an annual rent of £325,000 for their 22,000-square-foot (2,000 m^{2}) store.

== History ==
Building work began in 1989 following the demolition of existing buildings including the Pied Piper public house and the Co-operative store. One of the key phases of the building work for the two-tier mall was the pedestrian walkway over Priestgate. The centre's name was chosen in a competition by Durham student, Richard Blair. The Cornmill opened on 27 August 1992.

Sections of the BBC sketch show The Fast Show were filmed there.

In December 2006 it was purchased from Investream by the Moorfield Real Estate Fund for £84.5 million.

Extension of the shopping centre with a Debenhams department store was planned for 2015–6 but was later cancelled.
