= Rushmere Shopping Centre =

Shopping complex in Craigavon, Northern Ireland

Coordinates: 54.4507°N 6.3904°W

- Location: Craigavon, County Armagh, Northern Ireland
- Opened: 21 September 1976; 50 years ago
- Owner: Killahoey Ltd
- Num. of stores: 72
- Num. of anchor tenants: 3
- Floor area: 480,000 sq ft
- Website: https://www.rushmereshopping.com

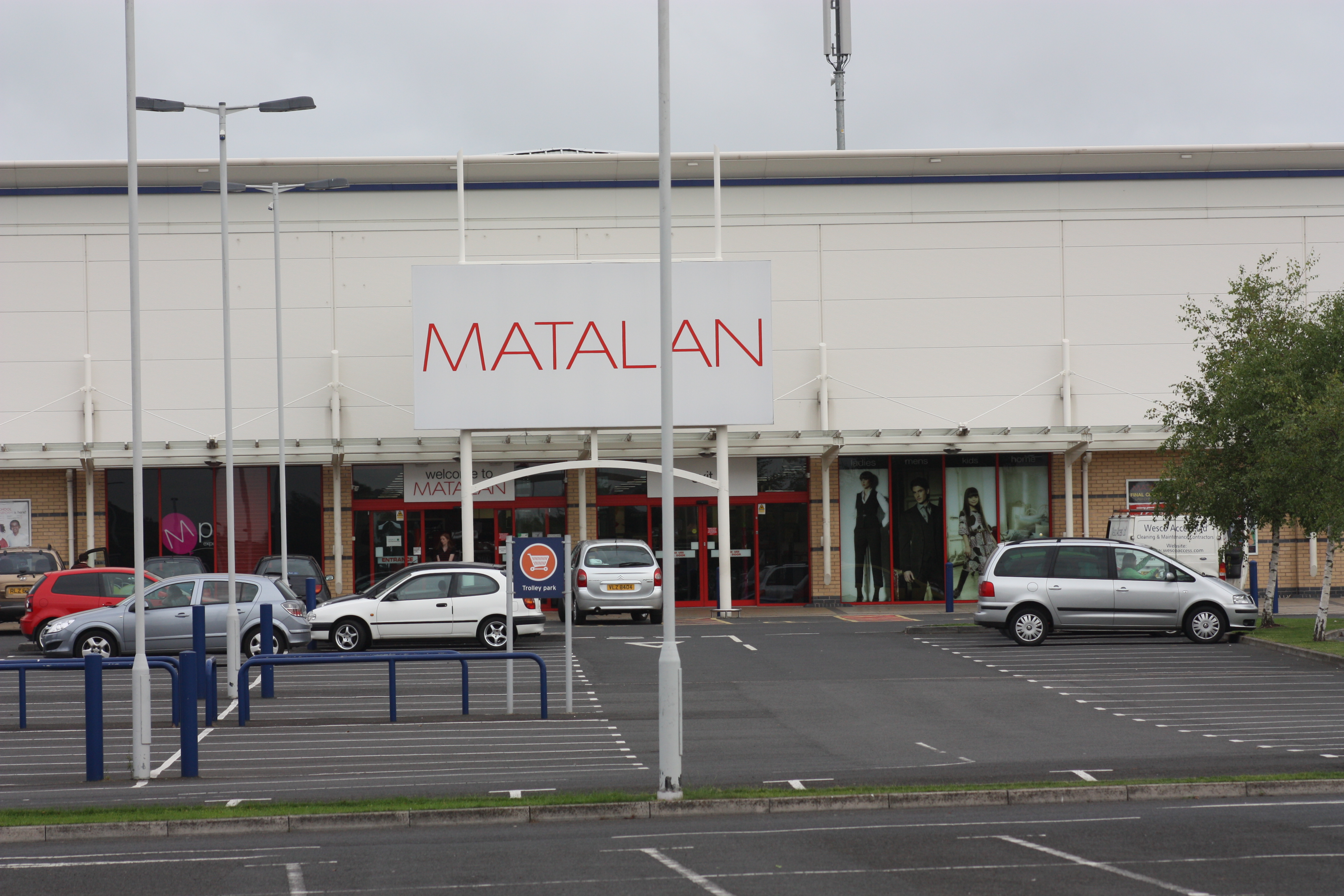
Matalan at Rushmere, August 2009

Rushmere Shopping Centre (formerly known as the Craigavon Shopping Centre or the Craigavon Centre) is a shopping centre and retail park in Craigavon, County Armagh, Northern Ireland.

Opened in 1976, the centre is one of the oldest and the third largest shopping centre in Northern Ireland, behind Belfast's Victoria Square and Derry's Foyleside, at over 350,000 sq ft, although combined with the retail park makes it over 480,000 sq ft. The anchor tenants of the centre are Primark, Dunnes Stores and Lidl, while the retail park's anchors are B&M and Matalan.

== History ==
On 21 September 1976, Rushmere opened to the public as the Craigavon Shopping Centre, and the anchor tenants were Dunnes Stores and Crazy Prices along with stores such as Marley Homecare and Eason.

In 1998, the Craigavon Shopping Centre reopened as Rushmere as part of a major expansion which saw a Sainsbury's and Tesco store open, the latter replacing Crazy Prices due to their buyout in 1997. The expansion also introduced a retail park with retailers Homebase, Matalan, Index and JJB Sports. The site was expanded again in 2004 with Debenhams opening as the main tenant in a 150,000 sq ft extension of the centre on October 21, and again in 2018 with Nando's and Five Guys opening.

In January 2011, Tesco closed its doors to move to a much larger store near the centre. The unit was later subdivided into two units, with the units being occupied by Home Bargains and Discount NI, which left Debenhams and Sainsbury's as the remaining anchors.

During the early 2020s, Rushmere had a major drop in footfall and tenants resulting in the closures of Topshop, Five Guys, a mixed Dorothy Perkins and Burton store, Debenhams and Sainsbury's, this was mainly due to the COVID-19 pandemic.

In 2022, the company which owned Rushmere, Moyallen Holdings Limited (which also owned the nearby Magowan West in Portadown and Victoria Place in Woking) was placed into administration, Killahoey Ltd bought the struggling shopping centre from the company later in 2023. In the same year, Primark opened on the ground floor of the former Debenhams.

In 2023, Rushmere began a redevelopment scheme to enhance the shopping experience, with a complete facelift to the centre, new stores, a slight expansion, a new slip road and a subdivision of the former Sainsbury's supermarket into multiple stores. A new Lidl supermarket opened in the former Sainsbury's petrol station on 18 June 2026.

In 2026, Dunnes Stores in Rushmere announced that it would move into a much bigger presence occupied by the former Tesco anchor and most recently Home Bargains and Iceland, Home Bargains would close to accommodate Dunnes' expansion, with the development set to open in autumn 2027.

== Stores and Entertainment ==
The shopping complex includes 70+ stores such as Argos, Boots, Dunnes Stores, JD Sports, Mango, New Look, Primark, Schuh, Søstrene Grene, TK Maxx and Waterstones, and eateries/cafes such as Caffè Nero, McDonald's, Nando's and Wingstop.
