= Kingfisher Shopping Centre =

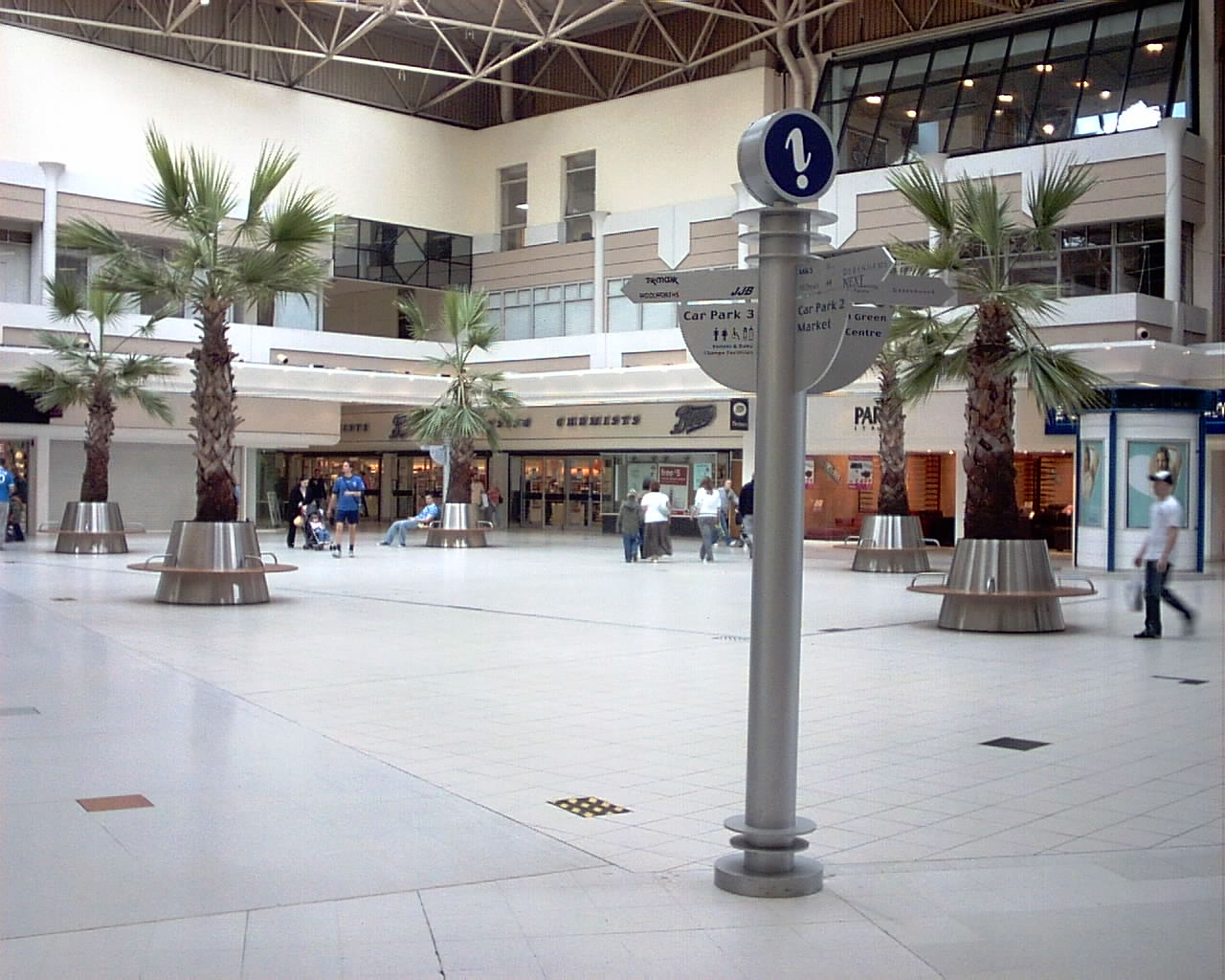
- Location: Redditch, England
- Coordinates: 52.30553°N 1.940455°W
- Opened: 1973
- Owner: Capital & Regional Plc and Oaktree Capital Management
- Num. of stores: 150
- Num. of anchor tenants: 14 (Next, Primark, H&M, New Look, TK Maxx & The Range)
- Floor area: 1,100,000 square feet (100,000 m^{2})
- Floors: 3 (Some shops have upper floors)
- Parking: 2,400
- Website: kingfishershopping.com

Kingfisher Shopping Centre is a shopping centre in Redditch, Worcestershire, England. It contains 150 stores, with a range of large and smaller units, including anchor tenants Next and Primark. The home, leisure and garden retailer The Range opened in July 2017, taking the former BHS unit. Several restaurants and cafes also include Nandos, a Vue Cinema, and the family entertainment centre 360 Play Town.

== History ==
Phase 1 of the Kingfisher Shopping Centre was opened in 1973. Worcester Square was opened in 1976 by the then Prime Minister James Callaghan and now forms the town's primary retail centre. It is well known for its palm trees in the centre's Worcester Square.

The original trees and their accompanying fountain were removed by the centre's management after health and safety fears relating to the age of the trees, which were nearly thirty years old. More appropriate palm trees were planted after the 2002 redevelopment, and remained until 2015 when they were removed in favor of a cafe in Worcester Square.

The centre is also well known for its large mosaic panels designed by famous Scottish artist and sculptor, Sir Eduardo Paolozzi, which are the largest publicly commissioned work of Art in Britain, and are valued at several Millions of Pounds. These Mosaics are located in the part of the Kingfisher known as Milward Square, which was named in honour of Henry Milward & Sons aka Milwards Needles, Redditch's oldest and largest Needle manufacturer. Her Majesty Queen Elizabeth II and John & Rosemary Milward (owners of Barlow Woodseats Hall and representing the Milward family) opened Milward Square in 1983.

The Kingfisher Shopping Centre was acquired for £130m in May 2012, in a joint venture between Capital & Regional Plc and Oaktree Capital Management.

The Kingfisher Shopping Centre has recently undergone major redevelopment within all aspects of the mall with the inclusion of the UK's largest indoor LED advertising screen provided by Lush Digital Media.

On 27 February 2026 an atrium in the shopping centre which dates to 1981 with alterations in around 1993 became a Grade II listed building listed as "Milward Square including mosaic murals".
