= Royal Victoria Place =

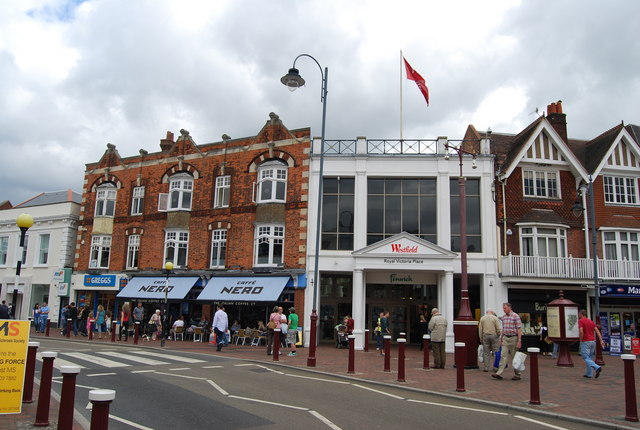
- Entrance to Royal Victoria Place from Calverley Road
- Location: Tunbridge Wells, Kent, England
- Coordinates: 51°8′4″N 0°15′56″E
- Opened: 21 October 1992
- Developer: MEPC
- Owner: Tunbridge Wells Borough Council (2023)
- Num. of stores: 99
- Num. of anchor tenants: 7
- Floor area: 1,000,000 ft^{2} (93,000 m^{2}) gross floor area including over 300,000 ft^{2} (28,000 m^{2}) covered retail
- Floors: 8 - parking; 3 - retail
- Parking: 1,689 spaces
- Website: Official website

Royal Victoria Place is a British, partially covered shopping centre in Tunbridge Wells, Kent. In 2019, it contained 99 retail units, as well as the Camden Centre, a community facility managed by Tunbridge Wells Borough Council.

== History ==
Royal Victoria Place was given permission in 1986 for a scheme designed by Chapman Taylor and 'inspired by Decimus Burton'. It was opened by Diana, Princess of Wales on 21 October 1992. Construction took 36 months and built over the railway line between Tunbridge Wells and High Brooms stations.

Tunbridge Wells Borough Council owns the shopping centre freehold and is obliged to pay 10% of certain refurbishment costs. The rent it receives varies with gross rentals but as of 2019, is a minimum of £882,000 per year. The head lease from the council runs until 2192 and is currently held by BL Tunbridge Wells Ltd, a subsidiary of British Land.

Hermes Investment Management bought out its fellow head lessee, Westfield Group's interest in 2012, and sold the whole to British Land for £96 million in 2018. BL Tunbridge Wells Ltd wrote off the value of its property by £15 million in 2019; £37 million in 2020, and a further £31 million in 2021.
