= Harry Corry =

Northern Irish home interiors retailer

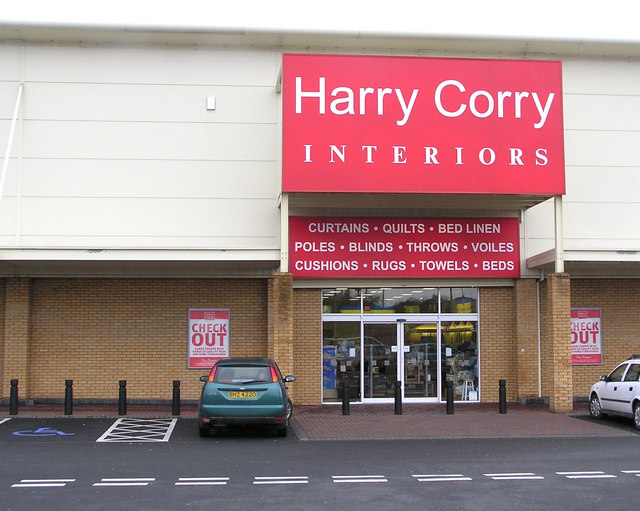
- Harry Corry, Omagh
- Industry: Homewares, retail
- Founded: Belfast, Northern Ireland 1968; 58 years ago
- Headquarters: Belfast, Northern Ireland
- Number of locations: 56
- Area served: Northern Ireland; Republic of Ireland; Scotland
- Key people: Willie Corry, John Corry, Anne Hill (Directors)
- Products: Homewares
- Revenue: ▲£55 million (2024)
- Number of employees: Over 700
- Website: www.harrycorry.com

Harry Corry is a Northern Irish home decor retail chain headquartered in Belfast, Northern Ireland.

Harry Corry Interiors is a family-run business which was established by Harry Corry in 1968. The business has its origins in a Belfast market stall operated by its namesake founder since 1948. The company has 46 retail outlets throughout the island of Ireland and 10 in Scotland. It employs more than 700 staff. It sells curtains, bedding, curtain poles, lamps and towels.

The company launched an e-commerce site in 2013, as well as building a strong presence across various social media sites.

In 2018 the company sponsored a Best Interior Design Award.

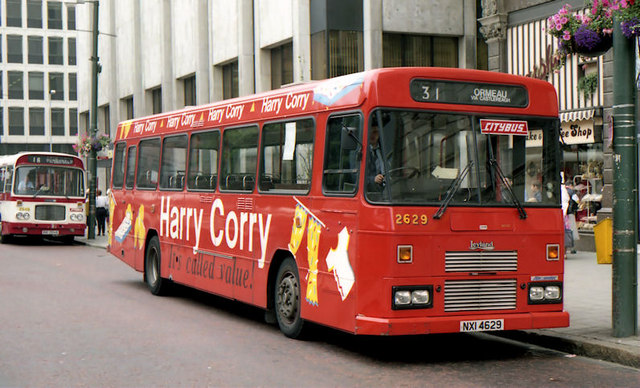
Bus with Harry Corry advertisement on Donegall Square West, Belfast

Harry Corry has sponsored the Belfast Giants since 2016, including branding around and on the ice at the SSE Arena, Belfast. They also sponsor four players at the team, Ben Lake, Cianan Long, Colby McAuley and David Gilbert after previously sponsoring Darcy Murphy, Ciaran Long, Ben Lake, and Jordan Boucher during the 2021/2022 season.
