= The Mall Fund =

British shopping centre company

- Industry: Property
- Founded: March 2002; 24 years ago
- Headquarters: London, United Kingdom
- Parent: Mall Corporation (NewRiver)
- Website: www.themall.co.uk

The Mall Fund owns and operates shopping centres in England using the trading name "The Mall Company". The shopping centres are usually branded and marketed as "The Mall".

The Mall Fund owned up to 10% of the covered retail space in the United Kingdom, making it the largest portfolio of branded shopping centres in the United Kingdom, before some of its sites were sold off. The Fund is managed by a team of 62 from Capital & Regional's Mall Corporation.

The Fund was formed in March 2002, by Capital & Regional and Aviva Investors. New investors have come in as the portfolio has expanded, and a secondary market for the units has developed. The fund now has 45 investors, including three overseas institutions.

Capital & Regional (including The Mall Fund) was acquired by NewRiver in 2024, The Mall was integrated into NewRiver's portfolio.

== Locations ==
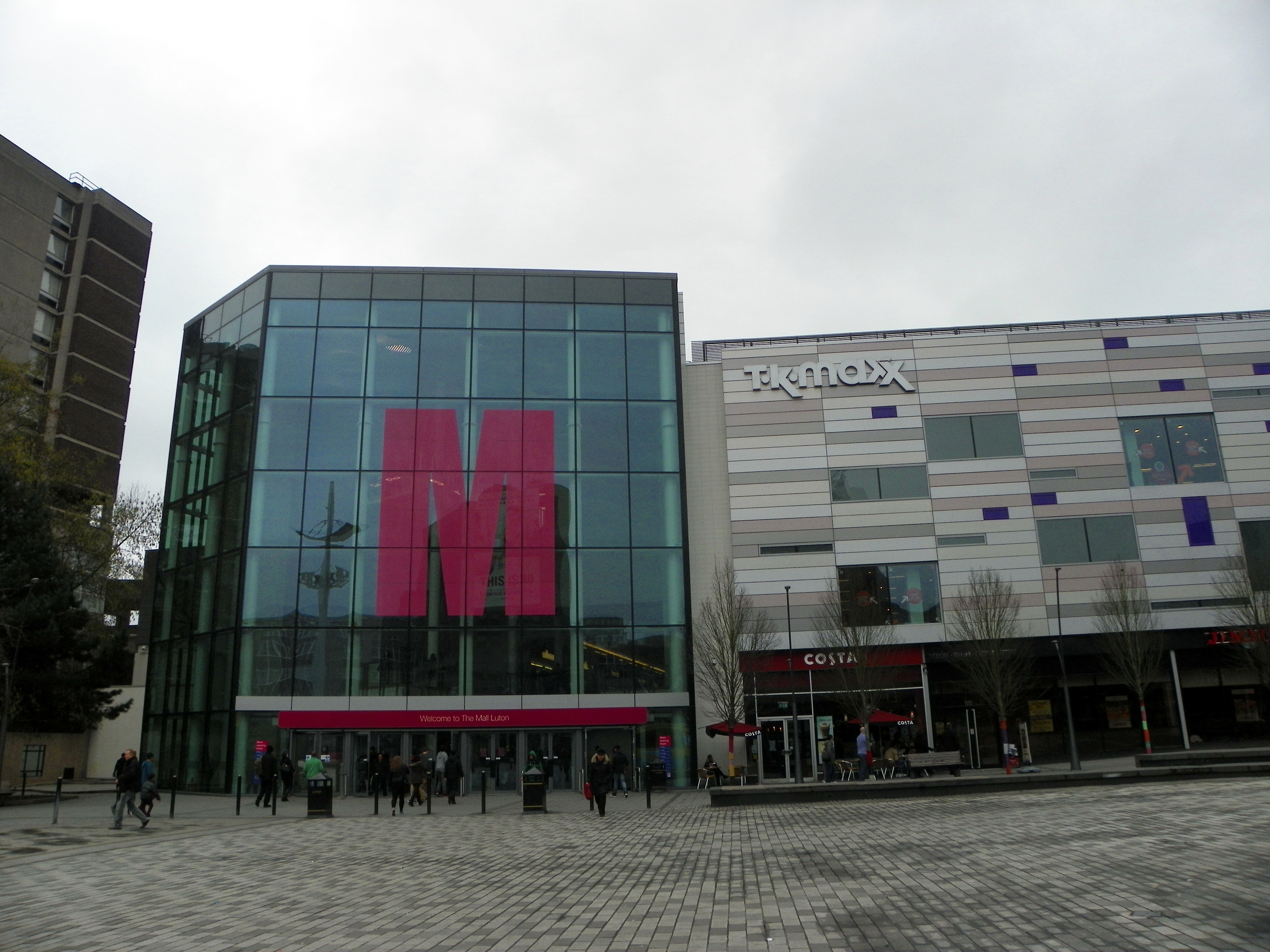
The Mall Luton

=== Current locations ===
Centres owned by the company include:

- The Mall Maidstone, Maidstone
- The Mall Wood Green, Wood Green

=== Former locations ===
The Mall Fund has disposed of some of its centres, usually by selling the premises on to another operator or holding company. In many cases, the centre will cease to use "The Mall" name and brand, and will often switch back to its previous (pre Mall) identity. The Mall Fund's most recent disposal was its shopping centre in Luton, which was sold in 2023 to Frasers Group and has since been renamed Luton Point. Centres which have been owned by The Mall Fund but are no longer in its portfolio include:

- Trinity Centre, Aberdeen
- Alhambra Shopping Centre, Barnsley
- Broadway Shopping Centre, Bexleyheath
- Pallasades Shopping Centre, Birmingham
- The Mall Blackburn, Blackburn
- The Galleries, Bristol
- The Square, Camberley
- Eastgate Square, Chester
- The Broadwalk Centre, Edgware
- The Ashley Centre, Epsom
- Howgate Shopping Centre, Falkirk
- Eastgate Shopping Centre, Gloucester
- Exchange Ilford, Ilford
- Luton Point, Luton
- Cleveland Centre, Middlesbrough
- Castle Mall, Norwich
- St George's Shopping Centre, Preston
- The Mercury Mall, Romford
- Marlands Shopping Centre, Southampton
- Gracechurch Shopping Centre, Sutton Coldfield
- The Pavilions, Uxbridge
- 17&Central, Walthamstow
