= Exchange Ilford =

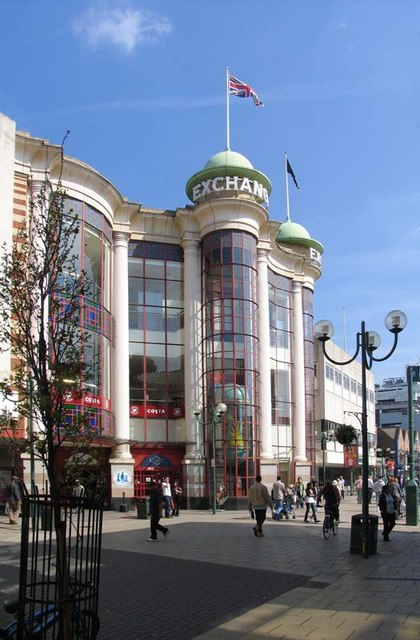
- The main pedestrian frontage of the mall, with 'Exchange' branding, on Ilford High Road in April 2007.
- Location: Ilford, England
- Coordinates: 51.5596°N 0.0724°E
- Address: Main Road
- Opened: 6 September 1991; 35 years ago
- Owner: NewRiver
- Num. of stores: 90
- Num. of anchor tenants: 5 Debenhams, Marks & Spencer, TK Maxx, New Look & River Island
- Floor area: 300,000 sq ft (28,000 m^{2})
- Floors: 3
- Parking: 1200 spaces
- Website: www.exchangeilford.com

The Exchange Ilford is the main retail shopping mall of Ilford, east London. It was owned by The Mall Fund until it was sold to Meyer Bergman in June 2010 and subsequently rebranded as Exchange Ilford. The Exchange is located on Ilford High Road in the town centre and opened on 6 September 1991 as The Exchange Mall.

== Stores ==
The Exchange's anchor stores are H&M, Marks & Spencer and TK Maxx.

Other major stores within Exchange Ilford include Next, WH Smith, New Look, Sports Direct, Burger King, Ryman, Poundland, Peacocks and The Body Shop. More stores are located just outside the Exchange, including an Argos, Waterstones and Primark.

== Structure ==
The centre trades from three levels of retail, though its architectural design means the lower mall is not directly accessible from the High Road, and customers need to use the middle level to travel the full length of the mall. There is also an upper level of retail and food court facilities accessed from the middle level. Transit between levels is via a series of lifts, stairs and escalators within the Mall; in addition, some stores trade from two or more levels of the mall.

There have been notable quirks in design and layout of some of the stores: Marks & Spencer was formerly two stores bisected by the Mall site: at ground level it was accessible from the High Road by its external doors either side of the Mall entrance, whilst on the middle level of the mall it was accessible from two entrances facing opposite each other (as in Broadway Bexleyheath). One of the two sides of M&S is also publicly accessible from the Upper level of the Mall. However, one side of M&S closed in July 2015, with the vacated site now occupied by Lidl at High Road level, with PureGym above in the middle level section: an area above this - which had formerly featured small stores facing into the mall, with no access to M&S - was as of 2023 under redevelopment for an NHS medical facility. M&S has concentrated its activities on the remaining site. Similarly, on the lower mall TK Maxx was initially two separate stores facing each other on opposite sides of the Mall, but this was later altered, with an extension of TK Maxx across the mall area to create a single unified store, in effect splitting the lower mall into three segments, with a third section around the Cranbrook Road entrance (by the former Woolworths/Wilko) separated from the other main part of the lower mall by TK Maxx. In late 2023 TK Maxx relocated to the mall's middle level - taking up part of the former Debenhams (previously Allders) space; as of 2024, the former TK Maxx site on the lower level had been reopened as a food-led specialist retail quarter under the name Cranbrook Walk.

Past architectural features of the mall include a granite floating sphere and a wishing fountain, both were removed in 2011 as part of a £10m refurbishment.

== Ownership ==
In 2012, it was reported that the centre is owned by the London-based Dutch privately held real estate investment company Meyer Bergman. Capital & Regional have owned it since 2017. Capital & Regional was acquired by NewRiver in late 2024, and Exchange Ilford was integrated into NewRiver's portfolio.

== Access ==
Exchange Ilford is in the town centre of Ilford and is accessible by car, with access to parking via Havelock Street and Ley Street. The centre is also served by the numerous Transport for London bus services which serve central Ilford.
