= Arndale Centre =

Chain of shopping centres in the UK and Australia

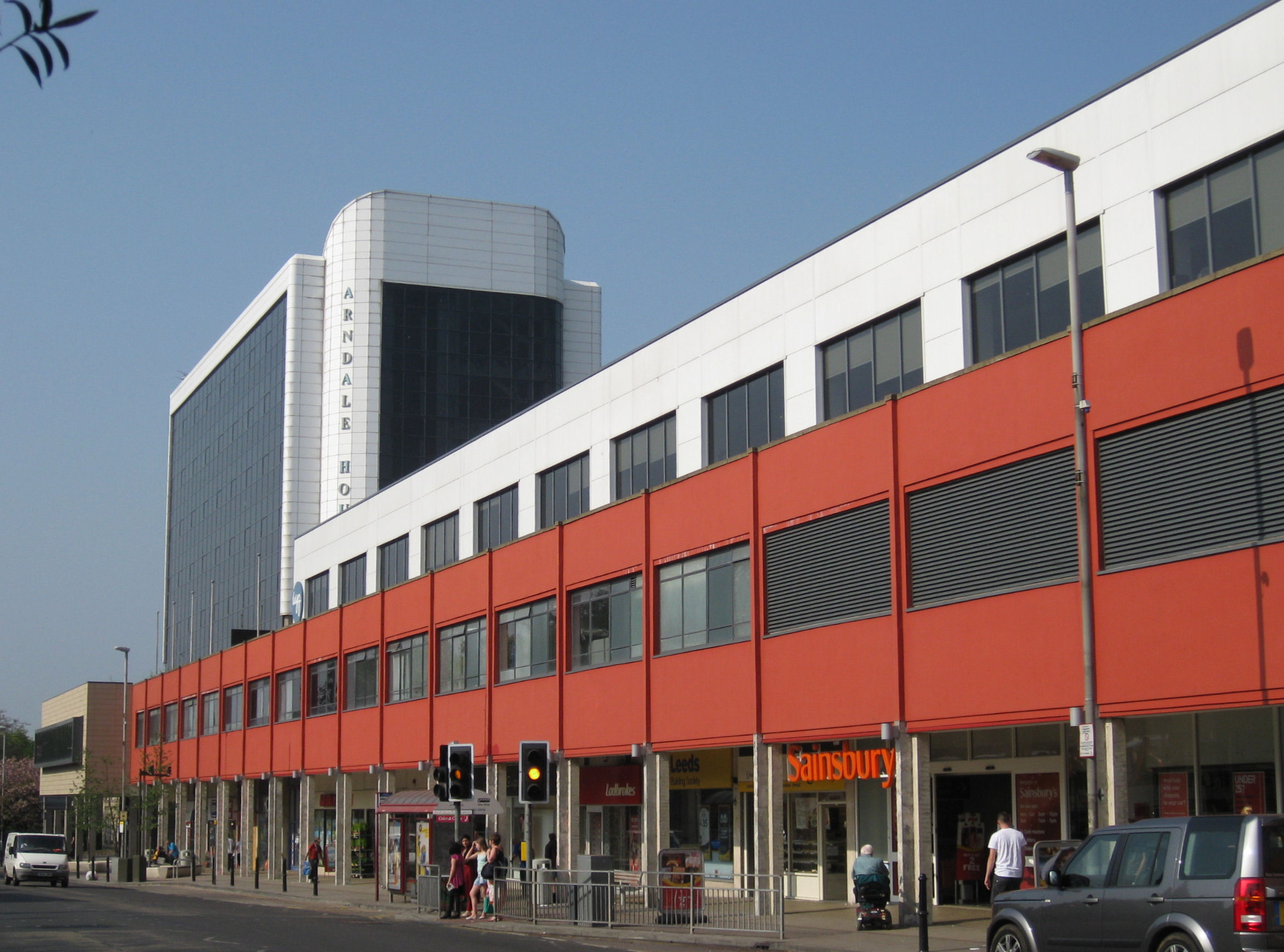
The Arndale Centre, in Headingley, Leeds, in April 2011

Arndale Centres were the first "American style" malls to be built in the United Kingdom. In total, Arndale Property Trust built 23 Arndale Centres in the United Kingdom, and three in Australia. The first opened in Jarrow, County Durham, in 1961, as a pedestrianised shopping area.

== History ==
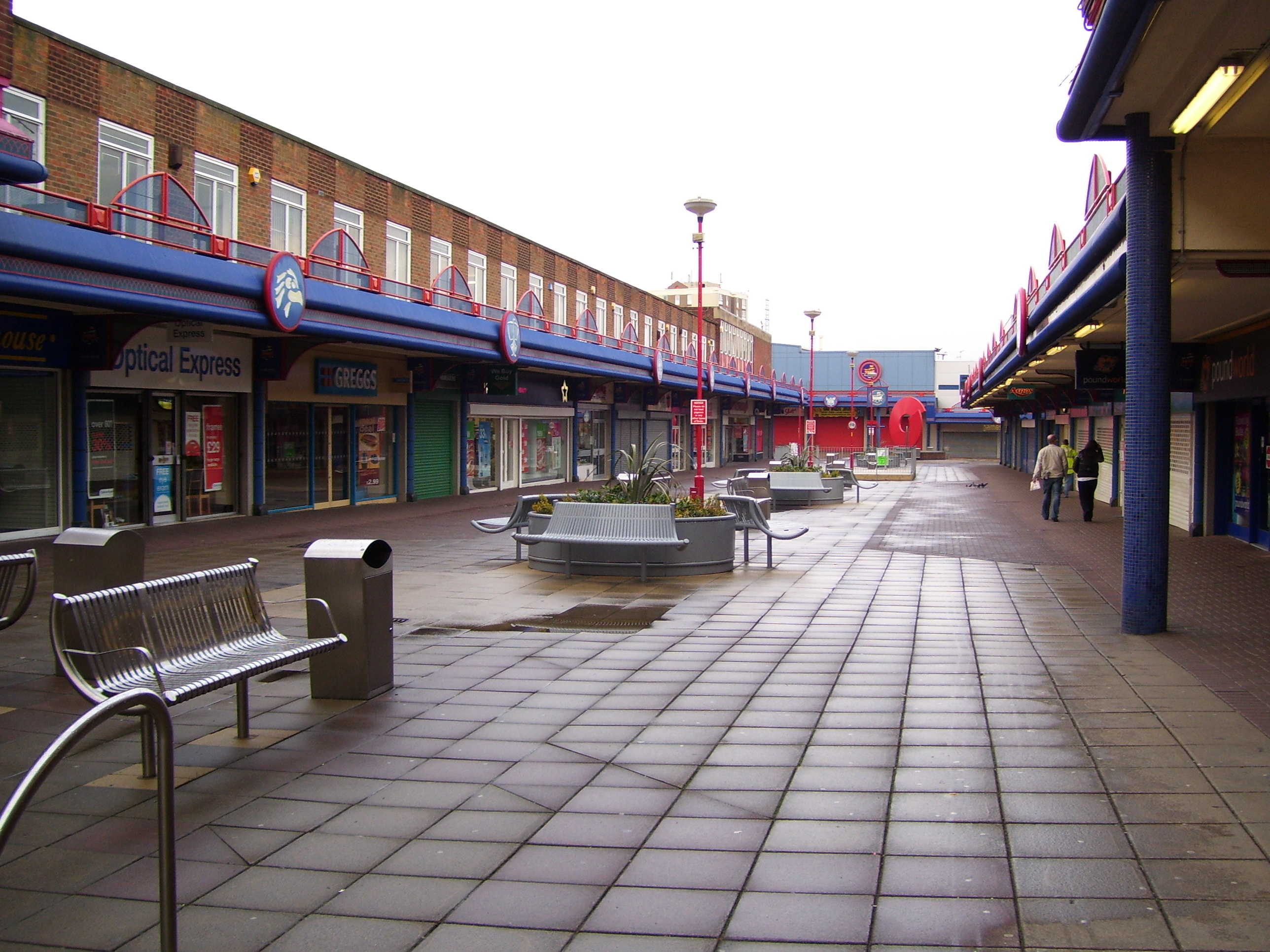
The first Arndale Centre, in Jarrow, opened in 1961. It is now known as the Viking Centre.

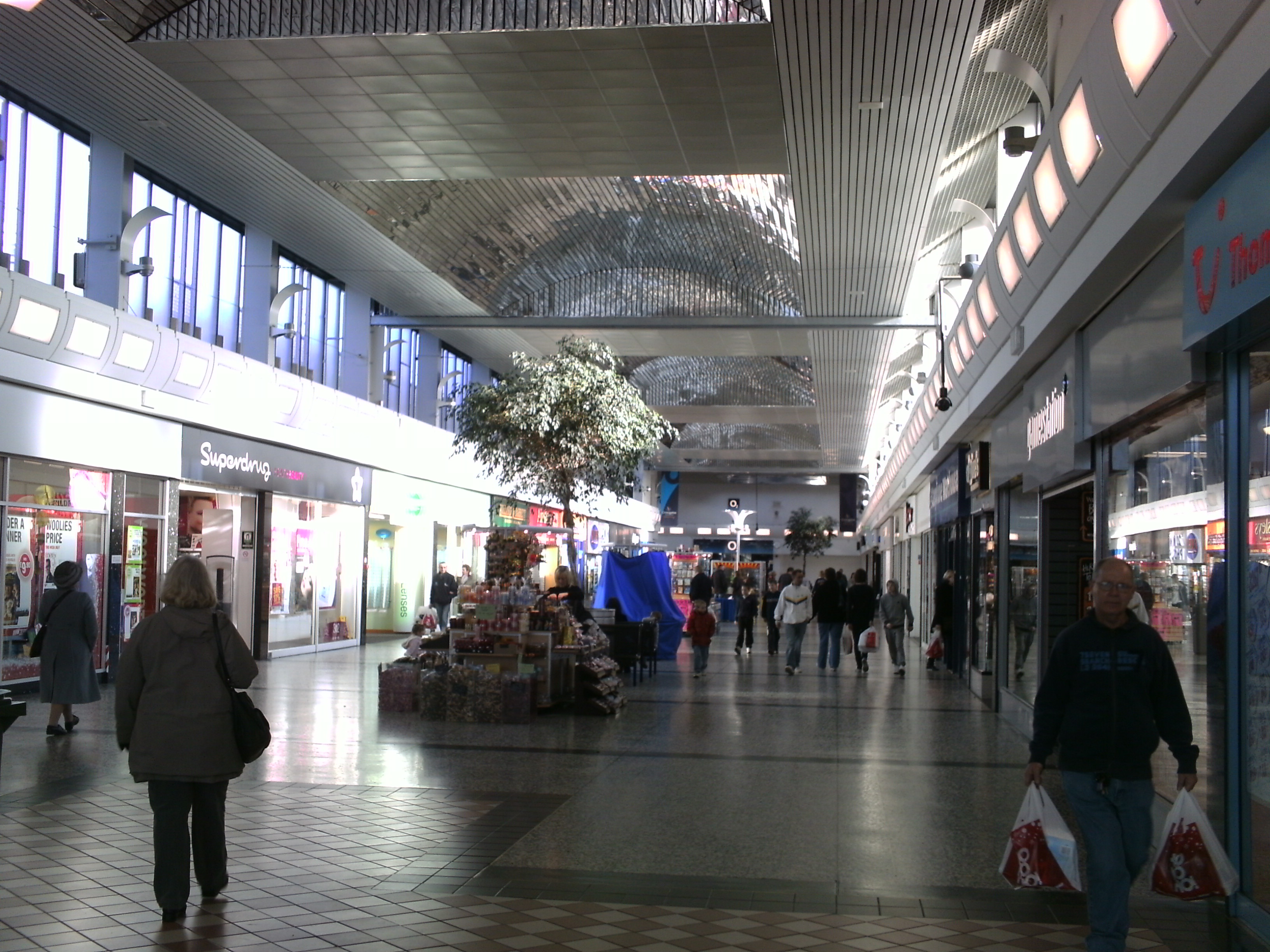
The Cross Gates Centre in Cross Gates, Leeds was an Arndale Centre until 2000.

In 1950, Arnold Hagenbach, a baker with a talent for property investment, and Sam Chippendale, an estate agent from Otley, set up a company called the Arndale Property Trust, the name being a portmanteau of "Arnold" and "Chippendale".

Prior to developing a string of large shopping centres, Arndale initially started to build new stretches of high streets as canopied shopping parades in a variety of small towns across the North of England as well as suburban centres. These early developments introduced large format shop units to post-war town centres in need of regeneration that suited the growth of growing businesses such as Woolworths and Marks and Spencer. Developments were often in conjunction with local councils to deliver new infrastructure such as roads or markets.

The trust purchased Bradford's Victorian Swan Arcade in 1954, with the intention of demolishing it and developing a new shopping centre, but it took eight years before leases expired and building work could commence, so in the meantime it developed a site in Jarrow, County Durham, which became the first Arndale Centre when it opened in 1961. Its trademark Viking statue, built by the Trust, was unveiled on 17 February 1962.

Arndale's first office was in Wakefield, West Yorkshire and moved to offices in Bradford in 1964 in the then-new Arndale House

When the Wandsworth Arndale opened in 1971, it was the largest indoor shopping space in Europe.

The largest Arndale Centre built was Manchester Arndale. It was redeveloped from 1996, after being badly damaged in an IRA bombing, and the centre has been owned by Prudential since December 1998.

== Criticism ==
Arndale Centres attracted criticism on aesthetic grounds as they replaced old buildings – often of the Victorian period – with modern concrete constructions, often in a brutalist style.

"There are people today amassing stupendous fortunes by systematically destroying our historic centres," wrote architectural writer James Lees-Milne, in 1964. "Eventually, all the buildings of the area – good, bad and indifferent – are replaced with chain stores, supermarkets and blocks of flats devoid of all distinction, and all looking alike."

— Christopher Middleton, The Guardian, 4 April 2001

The value of the Wandsworth Arndale was maximised by the high rise tower blocks built on top of the mall, which helped it to become, according to some commentators, "one of London’s great architectural disasters".

== List of Arndale Centres ==
=== United Kingdom ===
- Aberdeen – now known as Mastrick Shopping Centre
- Accrington, Arndale House – built in 1961 on Broadway; Arndale Centre opened October 1987
- Blackburn Arndale House – demolished in 2008 for the extension of The Mall Blackburn
- Bolton – now known as Crompton Place Shopping Centre, to be demolished
- Bradford – now known as Kirkgate Shopping Centre, to be demolished
- Dartford – now known as Priory Shopping Centre
- Doncaster – now known as Frenchgate Shopping Centre
- Drumchapel - built in two phases 1st from 1962-64 second phase 1971
- Eastbourne – now known as The Beacon
- Jarrow – now known as the Viking Centre, home of the 1st Arndale Centre in 1961
- Keighley – now known as the Airedale Centre
- Leeds, Armley – shopping precinct no longer carries a name; shop addresses usually referred to as Town Street
- Leeds, Cross Gates – now known as Crossgates Shopping Centre
- Leeds, Headingley – now known as Headingley Central
- Liverpool – Arndale House on Pembroke Road
- Longbenton – on West Farm Avenue, Newcastle upon Tyne. Built in 1962 and demolished in 2004
- Luton – purchased in 2006 by The Mall Company and then by the Frasers Group in 2024. Currently known as Frasers Plus Luton.
- Manchester – the largest of the Arndale Centres
- Middleton – now known as Middleton Shopping Centre
- Morecambe – on Market Street
- Nelson – now known as the Pendle Rise Shopping Centre, previously Admiral Shopping Centre - demolished in 2026
- Nottingham – known as the Broadmarsh Centre, demolished in 2021
- Poole – now known as the Dolphin Shopping Centre
- Shipley – on Market Street
- Sunderland – on High Street West
- Stretford – now known as Stretford Mall - closed 2026, to be demolished
- Wandsworth – now known as Southside
- Wellingborough – now known as Swansgate Shopping Centre

=== Australia ===
- Armada Arndale, Adelaide
- Westfield Marion – previously known as Marion Arndale, now Westfield Marion
- Frenchs Forest – now known as Forestway Shopping Centre
- Springwood, Queensland – on Cinderella Drive

== References in popular culture ==
The phrase "the Arndale Centre wasn't built in a day" (in place of "Rome wasn't built in a day") was used in the film Little Voice. A sketch in an episode of A Bit of Fry & Laurie about greetings cards with very specific tailored messages inside features a card with the greeting "Sorry to hear your teeth fell out in the Arndale Centre". Numerous other references to Arndale Centres exist in the show.

In an episode of The Royle Family, Nana is said to have a "spin out" outside Timpson's Shoe Shop (now closed) in the Stretford Arndale or precinct as it is known locally. British band Squeeze referenced the mall in the song "It's Not Cricket", from their 1979 album, Cool for Cats, with the lyrics: "at the Arndale Centre, she's up against the wall."

On his track the N. W. R. A. on The Fall's 1980 album Grotesque (After the Gramme), Manchester singer Mark E. Smith described the destruction of the Arndale as part of an apocalyptic 'future rising' of the North.

TV showed Sam Chippendale
Had no conception of what he'd made;
The Arndale had been razed,
Shop staff knocked off their ladders,
Security guards hung from moving escalators.

— The Fall, The N. W. R. A., on Grotesque (After the Gramme)

In the first Christmas special episode of The Worst Week of My Life, "The Worst Christmas of my Life", Howard refers to visiting Santa's Grotto at the Arndale Centre. In series four, episode four "It's Only Rock and Roll" of Only Fools And Horses, an Arndale Centre is mentioned, but it is not specific as to whether it is the Wandsworth or Dartford centre that is being referred to.

Characters in the television series Coronation Street occasionally reference going shopping in the Manchester Arndale Centre, the television series being set in Greater Manchester.

In the 2015 advert for Warburtons giant crumpets, the Muppets sing "it's time to hit the Arndale / to get some bigger plates".
