= 17&Central =

Coordinates: 51°35′0.07″N 0°1′23.7″W

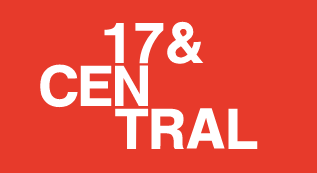

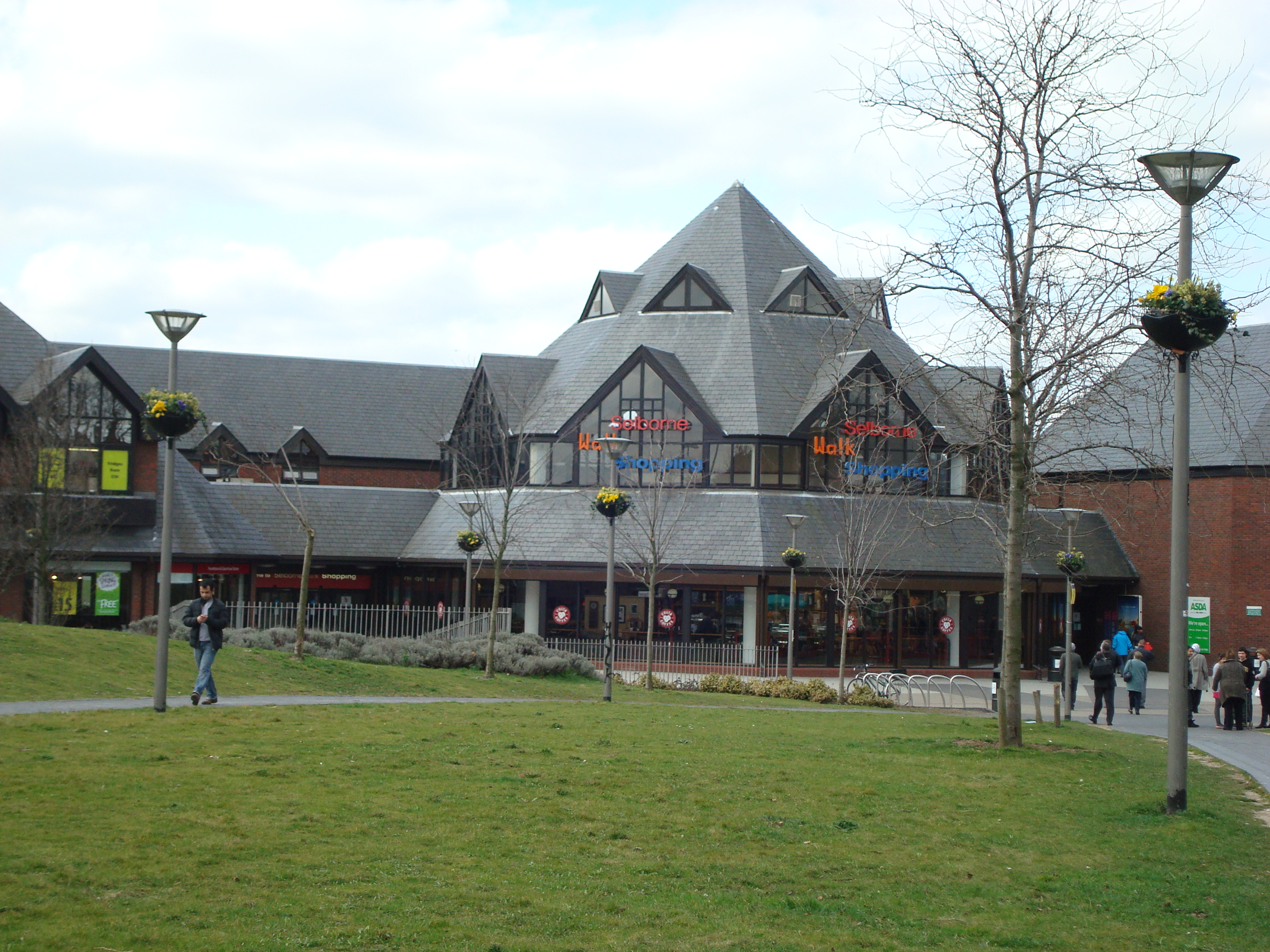
- Entrance from the Town Square Gardens in 2010. (when it was known as Selborne Walk)
- Location: Walthamstow, London, England
- Opened: 13 October 1988; 38 years ago
- Owner: Capital & Regional
- Num. of stores: 60+
- Floor area: 260,000 sq ft (24,000 m^{2})
- Floors: 2
- Website: www.17andcentral.co.uk

17&Central is a shopping centre in Walthamstow, London, owned by Capital & Regional. It was formerly known as Selborne Walk Shopping Centre (1988-2011) and The Mall Walthamstow (2011-2021).

Its site is currently in the process of being redeveloped as part of a residential and commercial mixed scheme.

== History ==
The centre was opened as Selborne Walk in 1988. It was acquired by Capital & Regional in 1997, and rebranded as part of The Mall Fund in 2011–2012.

The Mall was internally refurbished in 2015 and in 2018 plans went ahead to extend the centre by 86,000 sq ft (8,000 m^{2}), including other regenerations in its vicinity.

On the morning of 22 July 2019, a large fire broke out at the centre, considered a "major incident" by the police and tackled by firefighters for up to seven hours. The fire caused extensive damage and destroyed more than half of the building's roof. The damage caused the centre to be closed for several weeks, reopening on 4 September.

In October 2021 the centre was rebranded as "17&Central" - the name a reference to the E17 postcode area - with new exterior signage.

== Stores ==
Stores at 17&Central include Clarks, Asda, Boots, TK Maxx across one floor, along with restaurants on the first floor such as Subway and formerly KFC and Burger King before the fire incident.
