= The Square, Camberley =

Mall in England

Coordinates: 51.3380°N 0.7463°W

The Square (formerly The Mall Camberley and originally known as Main Square) is a shopping centre in the centre of Camberley, Surrey, England. It is the town's principal covered shopping centre and forms a major part of the commercial core of Camberley.

== History ==
=== Main Square ===
The shopping centre was originally developed in the late 1980s and completed in 1990 as Main Square.

In 2005 it was acquired by The Mall Fund from Scottish Amicable and subsequently rebranded as The Mall Camberley.

Plans for refurbishment of the centre formed part of wider proposals for regeneration of Camberley town centre during the 2010s.

=== Council acquisition ===
In 2016 Surrey Heath Borough Council acquired The Mall Camberley from Capital & Regional as part of a wider programme of town-centre investment and regeneration.

The acquisition formed part of the council's wider regeneration strategy and was one of the largest local authority-backed retail property acquisitions of the period.

Following the acquisition, the shopping centre was rebranded as The Square.

== Description ==
The Square contains more than 100 retail units and attracts approximately 179,000 visits per week according to centre management figures.

The Surrey Heath Museum is located within the complex..
