= Outcomes First Group =

English education company

- Trade name: OFG Education
- Type: Private
- Industry: Education
- Headquarters: Bolton, England
- Key people: Baroness Ford (chair); David Leatherbarrow (CEO)
- Owner: The Rise Fund, Investcorp
- Website: ofgeducation.com

Outcomes First Group (OFG), trading as OFG Education, is a Bolton-based operator of specialist and independent schools. As of 2026 it ran 85 specialist schools in the UK, mostly for children with special educational needs, and 16 independent schools under its Blenheim Schools brand, along with a school in Riyadh. Its brands include Acorn Education, Options Autism, Momenta Connect and Tute Education.

== History ==
Acorn Education joined the group in 2016 and Options Autism in 2019. David Leatherbarrow has been chief executive since 2018. In January 2023 OFG split from the National Fostering Group, with the two becoming separate companies.

In December 2023 TPG's impact fund The Rise Fund agreed to buy a majority stake in the company from Stirling Square Capital Partners, with Investcorp taking a minority stake.

The group moved into mainstream independent education in January 2025, when it bought Blenheim Schools from Chatsworth Schools. At the time Blenheim had four schools in the UK and one in Saudi Arabia. In April 2025 it bought Tute Education, an online learning provider.

Also in April 2025, OFG sold its adult residential services, 18 homes in total, to Achieve together. The homes were all rated compliant, good or outstanding by the Care Quality Commission or Care Inspectorate Wales at the time of the sale. Among them was Options Malvern View, which the CQC had rated inadequate and placed in special measures in 2022.

In September 2025 Cognita agreed to sell 12 of its UK schools to Blenheim, among them Cumnor House, Huddersfield Grammar School and Akeley Wood School. The schools transferred in January 2026. By then the group was supporting more than 11,500 children and young people aged 4 to 25.

Its first school outside the UK and Saudi Arabia, Colegio Areteia in Madrid, was bought from Globeducate in early 2026. In July 2026 the group announced a regional base in Dubai, led by Mark Whitfield.

== Leadership ==
The board is chaired by Baroness Ford. Leatherbarrow is group chief executive and Richard Power is chief executive for the UK. Leatherbarrow won the SEN Leader category at the 2025 Education Investor Power List.

== Schools ==
- Lamledge School in Shifnal, formerly Hillcrest Shifnal School. It was one of 27 independent schools issued with a warning notice by the Department for Education in 2017–18, and has since been rated good by Ofsted.
- Options Higford School, also in Shifnal, which holds National Autistic Society Autism Accreditation.
- Underley Garden School in Kirkby Lonsdale, rated outstanding in all areas by Ofsted in 2025.
- Chestnut Hill School in Flintshire, praised by inspectors for its support of autistic pupils.
- Options Applegate House in Barton upon Humber, whose grounds contain one of the last surviving public air raid shelters. It opened to visitors for Heritage Open Days in 2018.
