= Lesley Abbeycentre =

Shopping centre in Newtownabbey, Northern Ireland

Coordinates: 54.6559°N 5.9182°W

- Location: Newtownabbey, County Antrim, Northern Ireland
- Opened: 1978; 48 years ago
- Owner: Mussenden Properties Limited
- Num. of stores: 70
- Num. of anchor tenants: 3
- Floor area: 320,000 sq ft (2.97 ha)
- Floors: 1
- Website: www.lesleyabbeycentre.co.uk

Lesley Abbeycentre, formerly known as the Abbey Centre, is a shopping centre in Newtownabbey, County Antrim, Northern Ireland.

Opened in 1978 and anchored by Primark, Dunnes Stores and Next, the shopping centre is medium-sized, being around 320,000 sq ft.

== History ==
The Abbey Centre opened in 1978, the centre was built in the heart of Newtownabbey. A second anchor tenant, Dunnes Stores, opened in 1979 and has been open ever since.

The centre was expanded countless times, such as in 2000, which seen Primark open as a new anchor tenant and then in 2002 which saw British Home Stores open as another new anchor.

In 2014, property developer NewRiver acquired the centre for £140 million from a consortium which included former UTV chairman John B. McGuckian.

In 2015, anchor tenants Dunnes Stores and Next were given new contracts and confirmed that they were upsizing their presence in the centre, Dunnes originally opposed to Next's plans but it was resolved. Next opened in 2016 while Dunnes opened in 2017.

In 2017, Primark announced that they would be moving into the old British Home Stores unit within the centre which closed a year before, leaving their former presence which opened in 2000, the new store opened in 2019. The former Primark became occupied by Poundland, which opened in the same year.

In 2024, the centre's entrance was revamped with Danske Bank upsizing and Greggs opening in a new unit.

In 2025, the Abbey Centre was acquired by Michael and Lesley Herbert for under £59m, the centre was rebranded to Lesley Abbeycentre. Later that year, a series of redevelopments were announced, including expanding the centre and adding more stores alongside a new multi-storey car park.

== Stores ==
Shops in the centre include Primark, Dunnes Stores, Next, Poundland, River Island, JD Sports, Boots, and Argos. There are also KFC and Nando's restaurants.
