= Broadway Shopping Centre, Bexleyheath =

Broadway Shopping Centre

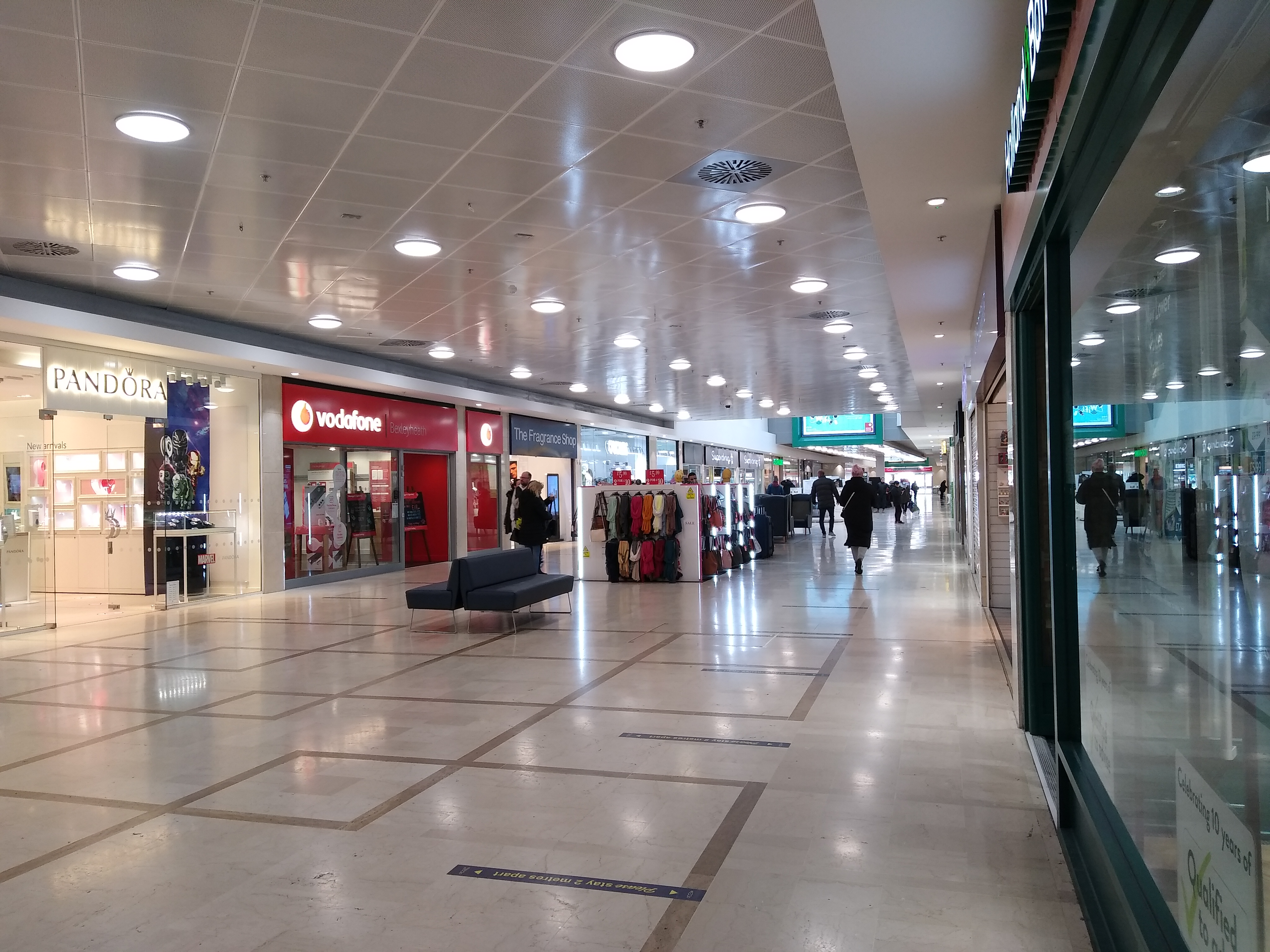
- Location: Broadway, Bexleyheath, Greater London, England
- Coordinates: 51.4561°N 0.1459°E
- Opened: 13 March 1984; 42 years ago
- Manager: Peter Sedge
- Owner: London Borough of Bexley
- Num. of stores: 59
- Num. of anchor tenants: 2
- Floors: 1 (main retail level); 4 (including parking levels)
- Parking: 1000 spaces
- Website: broadwayshoppingcentre.com

Broadway Shopping Centre (branded as The Mall Bexleyheath from c. 2004 until reverting to its original name in 2009) is the principal covered shopping centre in the town centre of Bexleyheath and is the largest single covered shopping facility in the London Borough of Bexley.

Whilst some parts of the centre opened in 1981, Woolworths being the first on 23 November, the centre was opened in its current form by Prince Philip, Duke of Edinburgh on the thirteenth of March 1984 and underwent an extensive refurbishment in 2007. It had been due to form part of a wider regeneration of the surrounding area of Bexleyheath over the coming years, which would have seen additional retail amenity, Bexley Council offices, a library and residential development adjacent to the existing building. However, in 2010, following the sale of the centre, its new owners confirmed the major expansion plan would not be going ahead, though a small extension to the existing site remained a possibility.

There are 59 retail shop units considered to be within the Mall building (including several premises where public access is from the Broadway itself) and additional smaller retailers in RMUs (small, freestanding kiosk-like units).

The complex is owned by the London Borough of Bexley, which holds the freehold. NewRiver Retail holds the lease and operates the centre. Jones Lang LaSalle acquired an interest in the complex in 2009, before NewRiver Retail acquired the centre and adjacent Broadway Square retail park in April 2016. In 2024/25, Bexley Council agreed new ground leases with NewRiver Retail for the shopping centre and Broadway Square.

== Information and location ==
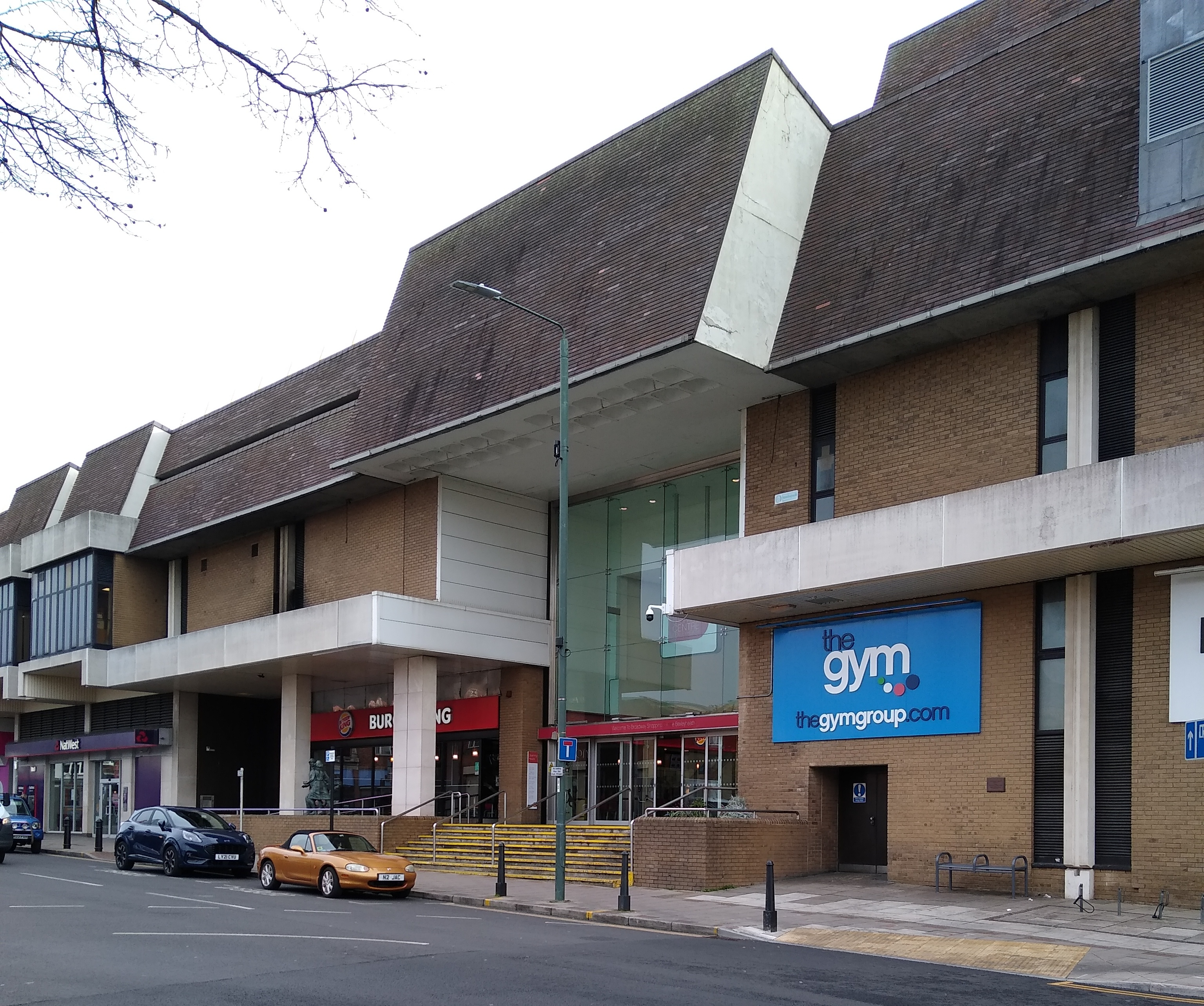
Broadway Shopping Centre, Bexleyheath - Townley Road entrance

The Mall is located in a rectangular building in the centre of Bexleyheath. The boundaries of the centre are the Broadway to the north, Townley Road to the west, Albion Road to the south and Norwich Place to the east. Norwich Place and the Broadway are now pedestrianised; the Broadway having been pedestrianised in 1993, and Norwich Place - partly closed off in the 1993 changes - was fully paved as part of the Broadway Square changes of 2001. Access to the malls is via pedestrian entrances at three sides of the mall (Broadway, Townley Road and Norwich Place), and vehicle access to the centre (for parking and deliveries) is via ramping at Albion Road.

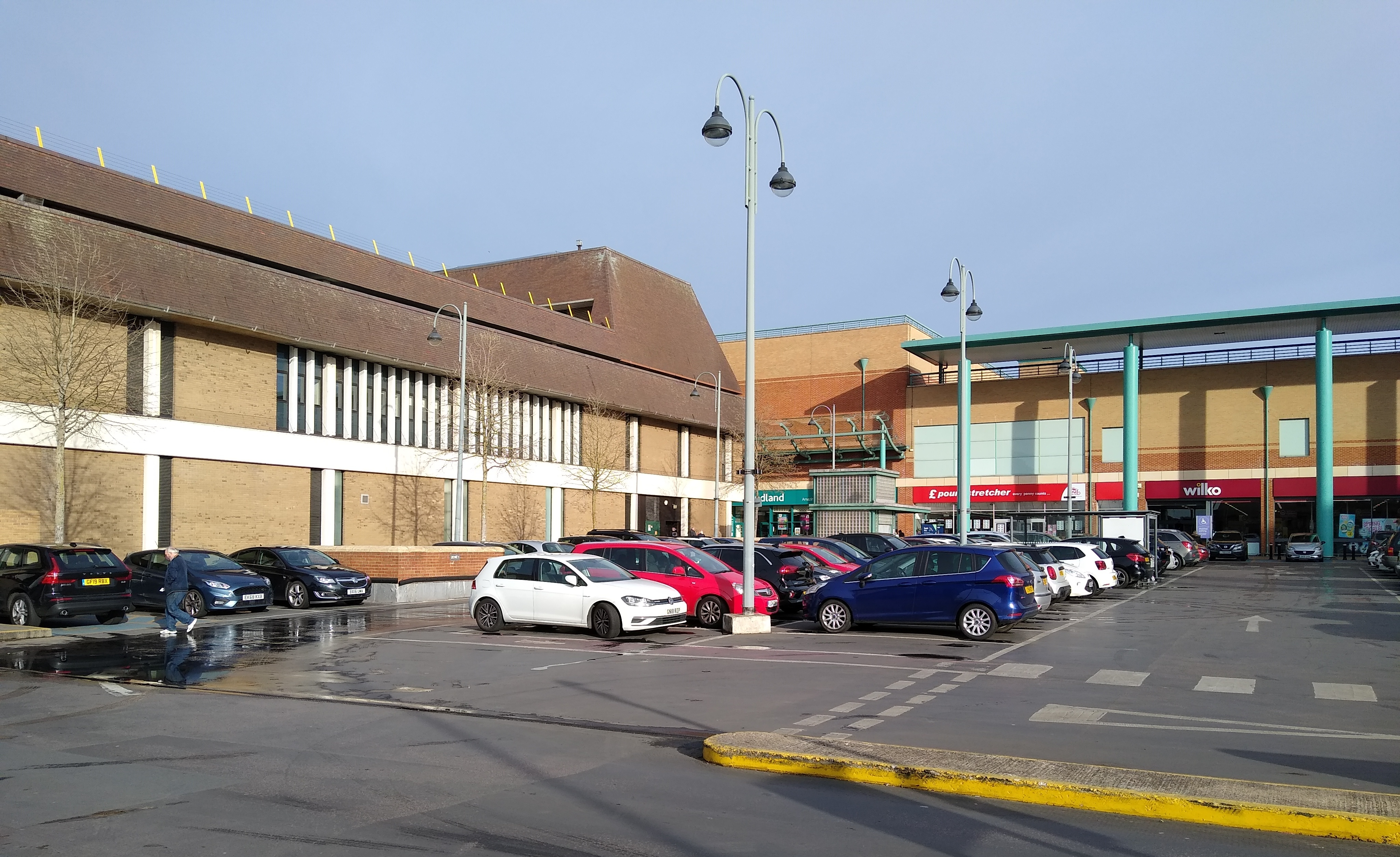
Car park

The centre is a four-storey building; public access to the retail stores is on the ground level; the first floor contains primarily 'service' (delivery bays), office space including the centre management suite, and the customer toilets; and the upper floors are car parking. There are two levels of parking - Upper and Lower - and each is divided into three sectors (East, West and Central), with associated lifts and stairs linking each sector to the mall level. Marks & Spencer, W H Smith and BHS have since opening offered some of their retail activity on the first floor, accessed via lifts/stairs/escalators within the relevant store; the 2010 H&M and New Look stores, and the 2011 River Island store, introduced retail space on the first floor as part of the remodelling process to develop their retail space. Additionally, some stores have used internal mezzanine ceilings to create a 'false' upper level in their stores, though none are currently open using this format; the former HMV, Next and Waterstones (later JD Sports) stores did this, though the stores which replaced them do not - Select, Deichmann and EE having reverted these units to trading on a single retail level.

The building encompasses three covered malls of shops which converge on a central square, and also includes a row of shops facing onto the Broadway itself (the shops between Marks & Spencer and Your Move (formerly Thomson) (inclusive) are considered part of the Mall, though their postal addresses are given as being on the Broadway). The sloping nature of the land in the centre of Bexleyheath means that the Broadway entrance leads to a mall which is inclined until it meets the central square, and the Townley Road entrance is the only entrance of the three to be connected to the street level by steps/ramping.

Stores trading within the centre's buildings include Boots, Waterstones, Card Factory, Greggs, H&M, Marks & Spencer, Morleys Stores, Sainsbury's (with Argos), Superdrug, and TGJones.

== History and design ==
The Mall opened in its current form in 1984, although outer sections fronting the Broadway opened earlier. Woolworths being the first, opening their new store at 93 - 105 Broadway on Monday 23 November 1981. The centre was built on a site previously largely occupied by Hides department store, the Lord Bexley Arms pub and neighbouring smaller buildings. The design of the new mall was a rectangular building facing onto Broadway, anchored by large stores at either end - Marks & Spencer at the eastern end and British Home Stores at the westernmost end - with accommodation around the centre for further large stores including a supermarket (Presto, later Safeway) and WH Smith and Woolworths all three of which opened both onto Broadway itself and into the new centre, and a large Boots store inside the mall, alongside smaller units providing capacity for around fifty further retail stores.

The interior colour scheme of the mall, until the 2007 revamp, was in hues of brown, gold and cream, with marbled pillars, brown tiling in selected areas, cream and brown marble effect floor tiles and copper-coloured ceiling tiles and strips. The 2007 revamp altered this, most significantly in replacing the entire ceiling with a new white and grey one.

The exterior of the building is principally brick, with dark brown roof tiles; a glazed white frontage was added to the main Broadway entrance area and the Townley Road entrance area as part of the 2007 alterations.

In addition to the main retail units, small kiosks have featured within the centre to offer additional retail space within the malls; currently there are a number of kiosks in the 'RMU' format also used in a number of the Mall Fund's other centres. The inaugural winner of the Mall Fund's 'Make Your Mark' competition for new retailers was 'Daisy's Dog Deli', a pet food RMU based at The Mall, Bexleyheath. This firm has since relocated to trade from a kiosk at the Bluewater regional shopping mall.

In the early years of the centre's existence, the site was known as the Broadway Shopping Centre; its owners included Norwich Union. In the early 21st century the building was acquired by The Mall Fund, becoming one of their network of centres under the generic "The Mall" branding. The Mall Fund subsequently purchased the neighbouring Broadway Square, and ran it alongside The Mall. In 2009, The Mall Fund's parent company Capital & Regional agreed a deal to sell the centre to Jones Lang LaSalle. As a result of its departure from the network, use of The Mall corporate material declined, though some elements (such as signage and branding) remained under The Mall identity, being replaced over a period of time. Other centres which have been sold off by The Mall Fund (such as The Ashley Centre) have reverted to their former names following their sale. Some marketing materials for the centre, as of Spring 2010, began to appear bearing the names 'Broadway' or 'Broadway Shopping Centre' in plain text. In September 2010, new signage bearing the name "Broadway Shopping Centre Bexleyheath", with the centre's new red-and-white logo, began replacing the Mall-branded elements. The full rebranding of the centre was timed to coincide with the opening of major new H&M and New Look stores on the former Woolworths site.

Following the sale of the centre, it was removed from The Mall's corporate website; initially, it did not have a dedicated website of its own as a replacement. However, JLL subsequently established one at broadwayshoppingcentre.com - with signs promoting this URL appearing in the centre from September 2010.

== Developments and redevelopments ==
=== Broadway Square ===
In 2001, a new shopping development adjacent to the Mall was opened, having been under development for some time. Broadway Square uses a 'strip mall' format to offer a pub and six large retail units, with an associated two-level (basement and ground) car park. Broadway Square was initially independent of the neighbouring covered centre, until it was subsequently acquired by The Mall Fund and run in conjunction with the main Mall. Retailers currently trading from Broadway Square (as at June 2012) are TK Maxx, JD Sports, Poundland, Poundstretcher, Wilko and Sainsbury's, along with The Furze Wren (a J D Wetherspoon pub). It was not initially clear whether the sale of the Mall to JLL also included Broadway Square, as the two buildings retained their separate identities under Mall Fund ownership, but new centre maps installed by JLL in September 2010 included the Square stores as well as the main centre, suggesting the whole site had indeed been sold.

=== 2007 revamp ===
In late 2006 work began on a major refurbishment of the Mall. The lavatory facilities were revamped, and as part of this the men's toilet was relocated, with the previous men's room becoming a baby changing and feeding area. The mall level was also revamped, with the copper ceiling strips and tiles, which had been in place since the centre's opening, removed, and replaced by a new white and grey ceiling. Several new skylights were also cut into the roof of the centre to allow more natural light in - due to the design of the building, with the mall level at the bottom of a four-storey development, access to natural light had been limited prior to the changes. There were also new glazed entrances developed at two of the three pedestrian entrances. The revamp also allowed space for Mall TV displays (monitors broadcasting a loop of information and promotional material) and advertising hoardings. Some of The Mall branded elements introduced in the revamp remained in the centre briefly following the sale to JLL but have now largely been replaced.

=== Previous developments of major stores ===
Due to the location and design of the building, historically bounded by roadways on all four sides (albeit with two of these later pedestrianised), it has not been possible to extend or materially alter the Mall. However, there have been a small number of changes to the configuration of units in the centre, which have made a limited number of new units available.

Two of these changes involved the division of the centre's original Woolworths store. When the centre opened in 1984, a large Woolworths was located at the eastern side of the centre close to Marks & Spencer. In 1990 this was cut in half, creating three new units - one which was initially occupied by Miss Selfridge, then by HMV from 1994 to 2013, and then by fashion retailer Select from 2014; one for Superdrug, which was at the time under common ownership with Woolworths; and one for Argos facing onto Broadway. The remainder continued as a smaller Woolworths. In 2000, Woolworths moved to the former Safeway unit on the western side of the centre (near to W H Smith), where they would remain until the UK Woolworths chain collapsed in 2008: this move saw the vacated smaller Woolworths divided again; this allowed Superdrug and Argos to extend to their current sizes, and also allowed the development of three new shop units, taken up by GAME, Phones4U and Sussex Stationers. Former office space above Woolworths was let to Reed, with public access to this space created by converting a former Woolworths fire exit. Following the move of Reed out of the centre and the collapse of Phones4U, these areas were pulled together, with the removal of the staircase at the former Reed entrance, in 2015 to form a single store for Footasylum (now Greggs.

Following the closure of Woolworths at the end of 2008, its later (ex-Safeway) premises were extensively remodelled and divided into two new retail units. Posters were subsequently applied to the hoardings which confirmed New Look would be taking up a portion of the redeveloped space, relocating from their smaller existing store in the centre; subsequently, a strap appeared on another section of the hoarding confirming an H&M store would be occupying that section of the space from September: this would be H&M's first presence in Bexleyheath. The New Look store opened in late August 2010, followed by the H&M in early September. The relocation of New Look in turn allowed their former premises to be relet to The Entertainer. The latterday New Look store closed in April 2025; it has yet to be replaced.

The only other major store to have changed its configuration since the mall opened was Boots, which expanded to its current size in 2001 by taking over a vacant single store (formerly occupied by Instep Sports) neighbouring their original unit.

Deichmann opened in a double-fronted store by joining the former Next premises within the mall to the neighbouring former Sussex Stationers store (which had prior to 2000 been part of Woolworths).

Morleys Stores opened a 50,000sq ft department store in the centre in spring 2017, taking the space vacated by the collapse of British Home Stores. In 2018 construction work began to install a gym above Morley's, this is operated by The Gym Group and opened in winter 2018-19.

Metro Bank applied to Bexley Council for permission to convert units at the Broadway entrance of the mall to create a new bank branch, to open in 2016; to enable this development to go ahead, in late 2015 the stores then trading in the affected units - Carphone Warehouse, Thomas Cook and Sblended Milkshakes - were relocated to alternative spaces within the building, with Sblended moving to an in-mall kiosk and the others taking then-vacant units. (Thomas Cook has since become Hays Travel along with the rest of the chain's branches following the Thomas Cook group's collapse, Carphone Warehouse closed all its standalone shops in 2020 and Sblended subsequently also withdrew from the centre, its kiosk space as of 2025 occupied by VIP Barbers. The former Carphone Warehouse store was initially taken up by local business The Movie Shack, which subsequently relocated into the larger former Clarks premises and in May 2025 moved again to premises at Mayplace Road West, outside the centre's boundaries, after their lease was not renewed. The former Carphone Warehouse/Movie Shack site has since been utilised to relocate jewellery store Warren James inside from its previous Broadway-facing unit.

=== Forthcoming and proposed developments ===
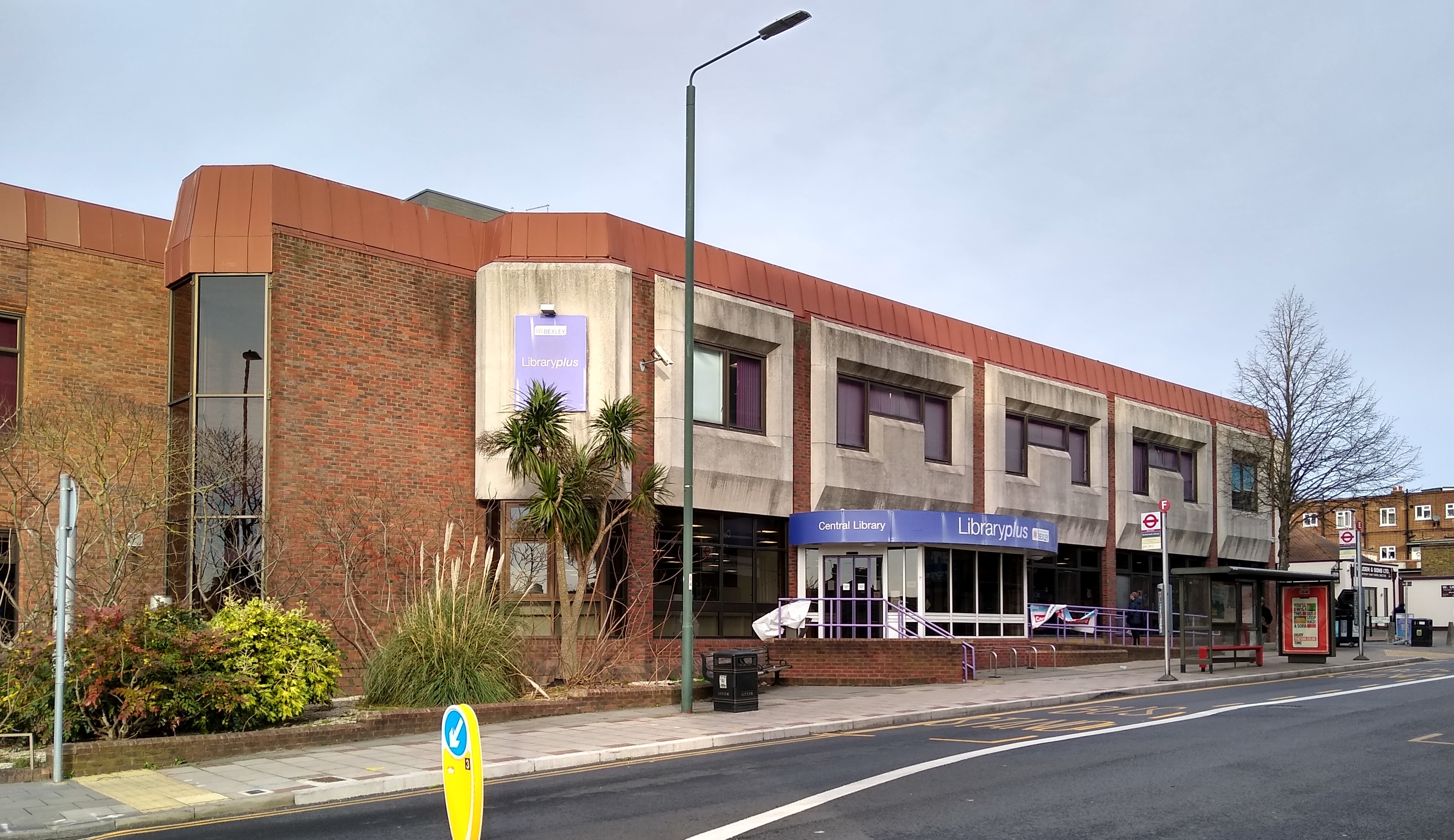
Central Library

The Mall Company backed a scheme as part of a proposed redevelopment of Bexleyheath town centre. The scheme would have seen Bexley Magistrates' Court, which currently neighbours the Mall on its south-eastern side, moved to the current Central Library site, and the Broadway Square car park replaced by a new parking facility on part of the current Civic Offices site. The existing magistrates' court, Broadway Square car park and the remainder of the Civic Offices site would then have been redeveloped with two levels of retail stores (linked into the existing Mall at ground level), with new council offices, a new library and a series of residential blocks located above this. This development was approved by Bexley Council in 2009 and was expected to be developed between 2010 and 2012.

The plans were submitted to the council by Capital & Regional (as The Mall Fund) prior to the sale of The Mall to JLL; it was not immediately clear what effect the sale would have on the redevelopment plans, or if JLL would take over the project in its existing form. In 2010 it was confirmed that the large-scale redevelopment proposed by C&R would not be going ahead: the library and magistrates' court would remain in their existing locations, with the council selling the civic offices site to a large food store (as had been proposed by construction firm John Laing in the rival bid for the original development plan). JLL may redevelop and extend their mall site in a smaller way, most likely by extending the building onto the Broadway Square car park which neighbours the existing building.

Bexley Council subsequently came to an agreement with Tesco, which had earlier bought the former Woolwich Building Society offices on Erith Road and had planned a supermarket for the site; under this deal, the Civic Offices would transfer their operations to the former Woolwich site, with the current Civic Offices to be replaced with a Tesco store. The relocation of Civic Offices functions to the former WBS building and the demolition of the prior offices went ahead as planned, but Tesco subsequently included the Bexleyheath site among a list of over 40 new stores which would now not be going ahead; the former Civic Offices site was later sold off to Frasers Group and used for a predominantly residential development constructed by Bellway, under the banner of Eastside Quarter. As part of Eastside Quarter, Frasers opened a large store featuring its Sports Direct, USC and Game brands in late 2022, leading to the closure of the existing Game store in the Broadway Centre building (in part of the original Woolworths space facing Broadway) - this has since been taken over by the Bakers+Baristas coffee shop.

== Former retailers ==
Retailers which have formerly traded at the Broadway Shopping Centre but no longer do so include Dixons, Topshop and Topman, Miss Selfridge, Woolworths, Safeway, Rosebys, Radio Rentals, Our Price, Dolcis, JJB Sports, The Link, Rumbelows, Principles, Bay Trading Company, Next, Birthdays/Pure Party, Burton/Dorothy Perkins, Monsoon Accessorize, Claire's and Poundland. Some of these firms are still trading elsewhere in the country, though others are now defunct or dormant: see the retailers' pages for more detailed information about each firm.

JD Sports traded inside the mall for a time (in the site which is now occupied by EE) after their merger with First Sport, which previously occupied the unit, but subsequently closed this small store to focus on their larger and more recent Broadway Square site.

Mothercare and Early Learning Centre were located in separate stores inside the shopping centre for a number of years, but relocated in September 2010 to a former Aldi store on Market Place, outside the centre's boundaries. (This store has since closed, and as of 2020 all UK Mothercare stores have ceased operations.)

The Greenwich & Bexley Community Hospice (formerly Cottage Hospice) charity operated a retail store at various store locations within the mall building from 2009, generally taking short-term lets of then-vacant units and relocating as and when required to release stores for new regular tenants. The hospice's final store location within the building during this run closed in June 2011 and was not replaced; the hospice's other charity shops elsewhere continued to trade as normal. A new Hospice charity shop opened (in the former Hype store) in November 2011, moving to the former Pure Party premises in 2012, and this store closed in early 2013. After more than a decade away, a new Community Hospice shop opened - facing Broadway adjacent to WH Smith - in October 2024.

Peacocks traded from Broadway Square from the unit's opening in 2001 until the firm's collapse in 2012; it was not one of the stores rescued by Edinburgh Woollen Mill. In its later years Peacocks had operated a Bonmarche concession on its upper level; this too has closed. In May 2012, Poundworld took over the Peacocks premises, installing its own sister firm DiscountUK in the former Bonmarche space. (This store closed in summer 2018 along with all other Poundworld stores, and has more recently been occupied by OneBelow.) In spring 2015, Peacocks included the former (pre-2011) River Island premises within the main centre on a list of new and forthcoming stores posted to its website; when opened, the new Peacocks in fact combined the ex-River Island site with the neighbouring former Harris's. This newer Peacocks had closed by 2021, following another collapse and partial rescue of the Peacocks chain. The store was later reoccupied by Choice Outlet: in 2026 Choice relocated to a Broadway Square unit vacated by Poundland and the in-mall unit was reallocated to Waterstones.

Local ladieswear boutique Honeybee closed in 2012 having been located in the same position in the centre for over 25 years. Its place was taken by Gosh relocating from its previous site. As of 2018 this store was occupied by Smiggle, who carried out the most thorough refurbishment of the space undertaken since the Honeybee era. Following the closure of Smiggle, the site is now occupied by jewellery store Lovisa.

Footwear retailer Harris's took up the former ELC store inside the mall in December 2010, then moved to the former La Senza store site on the Broadway, outside the centre's boundaries, in 2013. The former ELC/Harris's store was subsequently absorbed as part of the 2015-on Peacocks/Choice/Waterstones store.

HMV traded from a unit in the mall - now occupied by Yours Clothing - between November 1994 and March 2013, when it closed along with over sixty other branches of the chain. In August 2022 it was announced that the firm, having since come under the ownership of Doug Putman's Sunrise Records, would reopen a Bexleyheath store after over nine years' absence. Similarly, Clarks traded from the mall for a number of years (latterly as a Clarks Outlet discount store) before being included on a list of loss-making stores which would be closed if landlords refused to move to letting the unit on a zero-rent basis; the firm has subsequently reopened a new, smaller full-line store in a different part of the mall building.

Two stores which had previously traded at the centre returned in 2026. Clintons opened a large store in the former Clarks (Outlet)/Movie Shack premises on 12 September, a few doors along the mall from their prior premises which had closed in the early 2020s. (That previous store - occupied by clothing retailer Weigh to Wear by the time of Clintons' reopening - had opened as a Clinton Cards store in the early 00s, replacing Topshop and succeeding two smaller Clintons stores previously in the building, one of which - later occupied by Claire's - neighbours the new 2026 store. The other is now Starbucks.) In the period since Clintons' closure, then-rival Cardzone had opened a small store at the Broadway; with Cardzone and Clintons coming under common ownership in 2024, the 2026 Clintons is effectively a relocation of the Cardzone business into larger premises under its now-sibling brand, with the smaller Cardzone store closing in tandem with the new Clintons opening. Elsewhere, the relocation of Choice Outlet to space freed up by the departure of Poundland from Bexleyheath in turn vacated the prior Choice store, which it was subsequently confirmed would become Waterstones, returning to Bexleyheath after a near thirty-year absence, having closed their previous bookshop in the centre in the late 1990s (this had been located in a neighbouring unit, later occupied by First Sport and now EE.)
