= Alhambra Shopping Centre =

Coordinates: 53.5509°N 1.4783°W

The Alhambra Shopping Centre
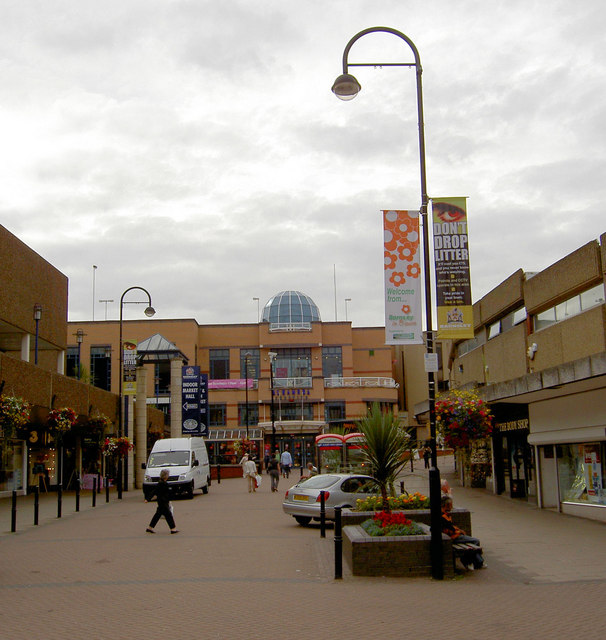
- The Mall Barnsley 2017
- Location: Barnsley
- Opened: 1991; 35 years ago
- Developer: F&C REIT
- Manager: F&C REIT
- Num. of stores: 41
- Num. of anchor tenants: 4
- Floor area: 91,140 m^{2} (981,000 sq ft)
- Floors: 2
- Parking: Alhambra Car Park
- Public transit: Barnsley Interchange
- Website: https://www.alhambracentre.co.uk/

Alhambra Shopping Centre, also known by its former name The Mall Barnsley, is Barnsley's main shopping complex, housing 41 shops and adjacent to Barnsley Market. The centre was opened in 1991. A number of chains have been in the centre in the past, most notable was Woolworths which ceased trading in December 2008. It was owned and operated by shopping centre operator The Mall Fund until its sale to F&C REIT in September 2011. The centre was in receivership since 2021. On 29 September 2023, Barnsley Council completed its takeover of The Alhambra Shopping Centre. In the centre there are a number of small retail stalls which encourage independent businesses to start.

Current stores (as of January 2023) include:

Primark, the Works, Select, Bonmarche, CeX, Iceland, Vodafone, ~~Wilko~~ (Closed at the end of 2023, its entrance to the centre is also closed), Poundstretcher, Card Factory, MaxiDeals and Hays Travel.
