= Grosvenor Shopping Centre =

Coordinates: 53.1889°N 2.8890°W

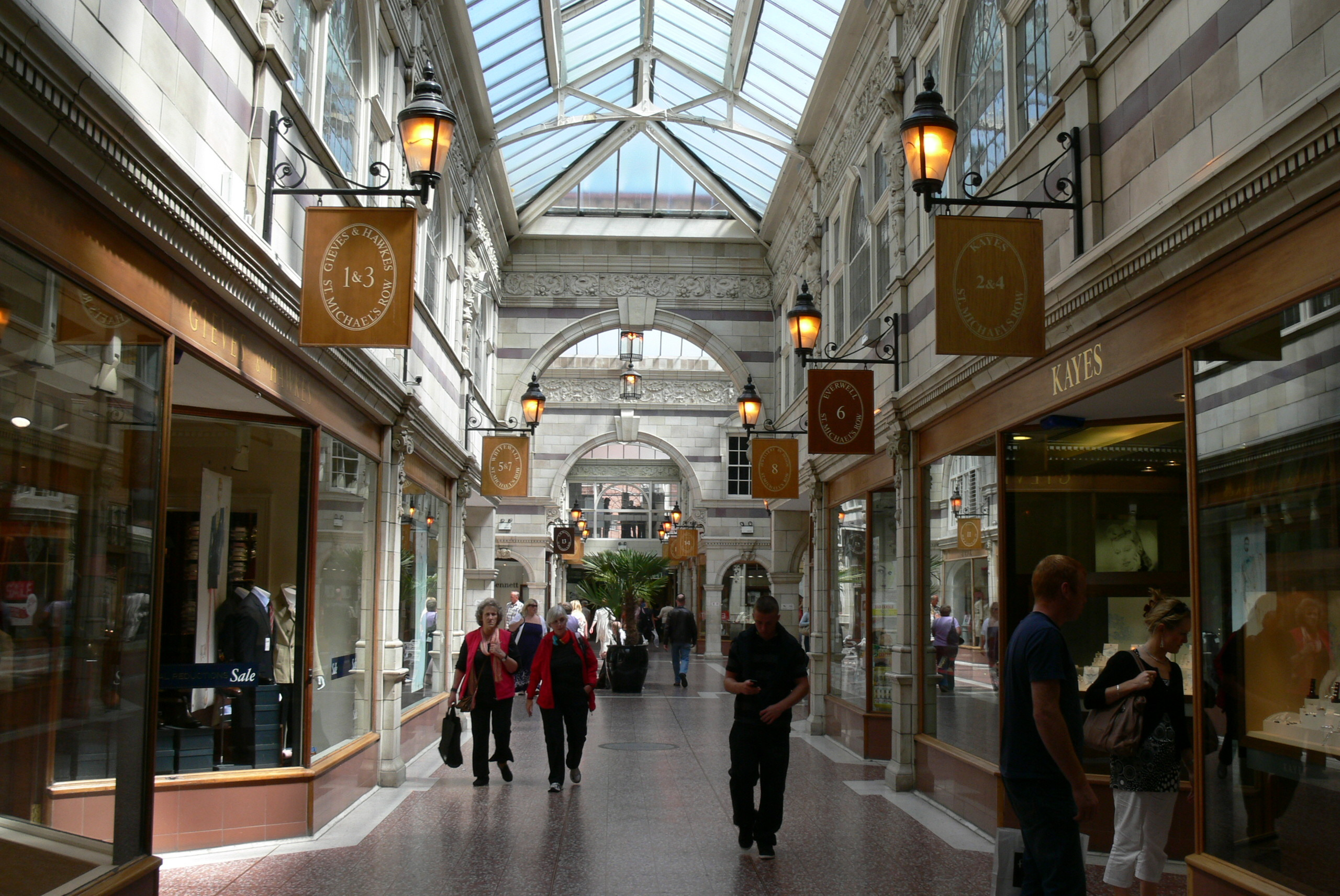
- Inside The Grosvenor Shopping Centre
- Website: thegrosvenorcentre.co.uk

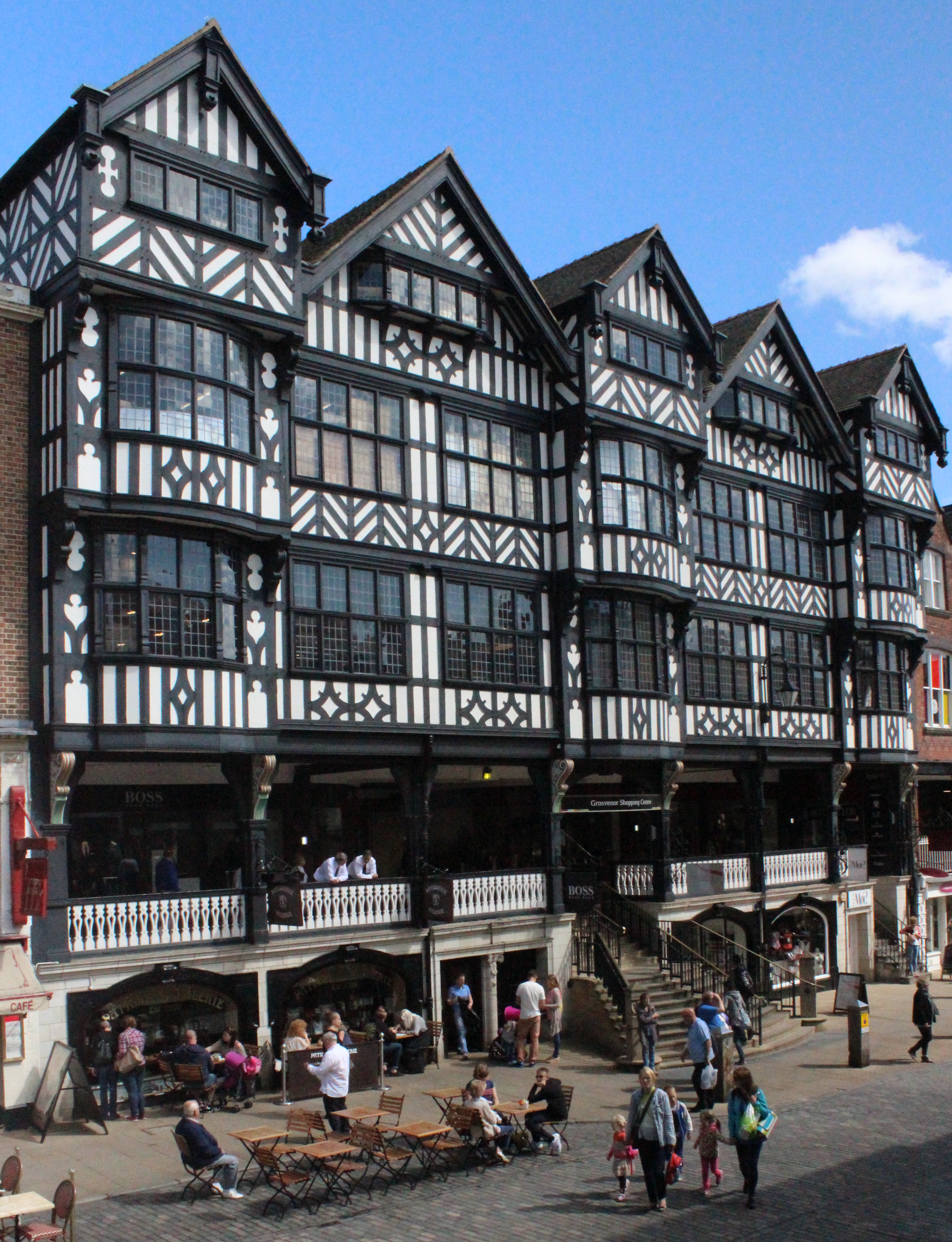
Western entrance on Bridge Street

The Grosvenor Shopping Centre (for a time known as The Mall Grosvenor or The Mall Chester) is a large shopping precinct in Chester, England. It hosts around 70 stores. Whereas most of the central shopping area of Chester consists of historic streets, The Mall provides undercover shopping to complement the wide range of shops in other locations around the city. It consists of some Edwardian buildings with modern covered shopping malls. It was owned by The Mall Fund, and carried their corporate branding. It was sold sometime in 2009 and the name Grosvenor Shopping Centre reinstated by the new owners.
