= Epsom Playhouse =

Theatre in Epsom, Surrey

- The Playhouse
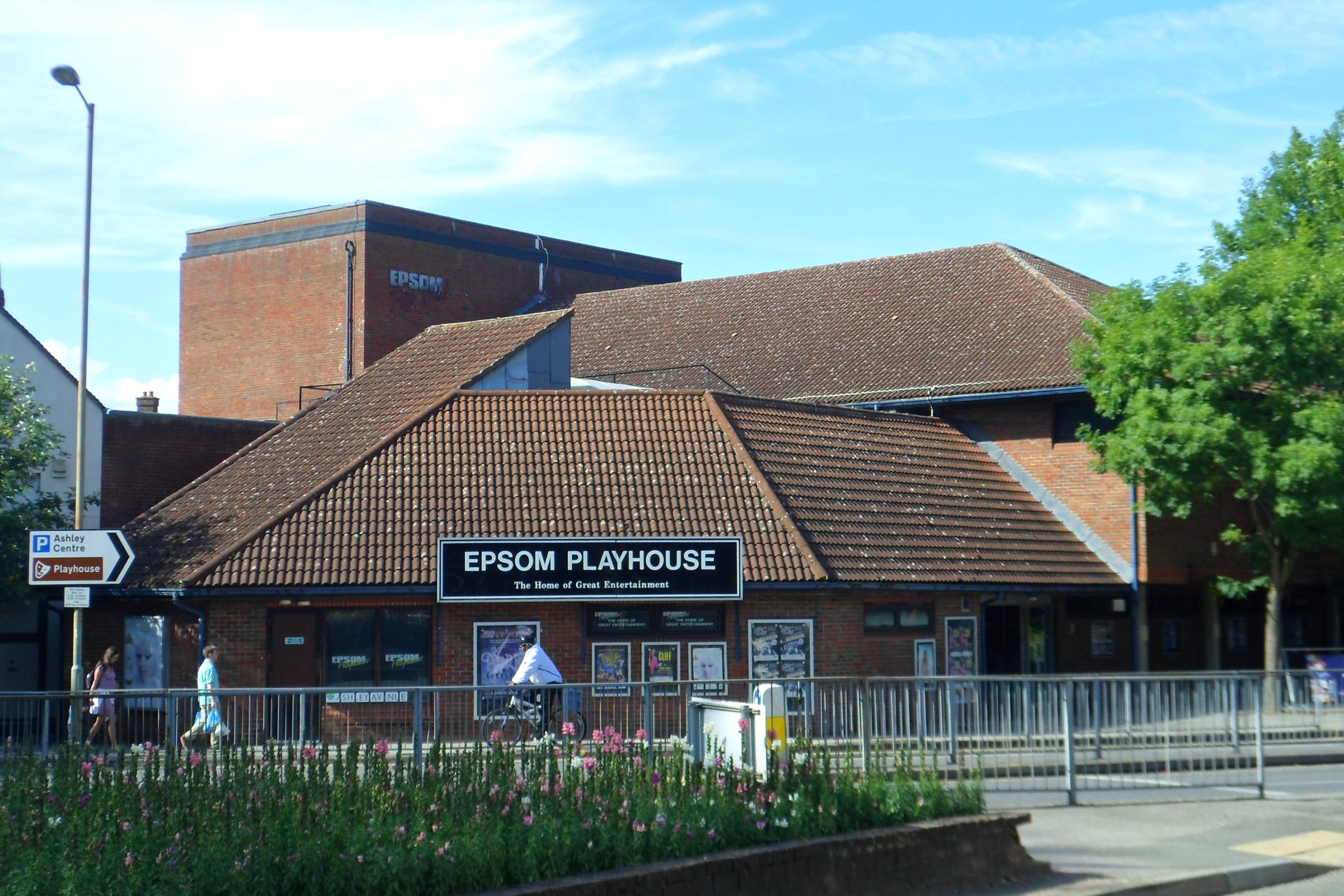
- Epsom Playhouse in 2013
- Interactive map of Epsom Playhouse
- Address: Ashley Ave, Epsom KT18 5AL; Epsom; United Kingdom
- Coordinates: 51.331274°N 0.268421°W
- Capacity: 406 for the main studio, 80 in the Myers Studio
- Type: Modern
- Production: Touring productions

Construction
- Opened: 1984
- Years active: 40 years
- Architect: Modern Architecture

Epsom Playhouse is the main theatre in Epsom and Ewell, Surrey, England.

== Performances ==
This 406-seat theatre hosts internationally travelling casts and comedy acts as part of their tours and amateur productions.

=== Annual events ===
- The theatre hosts a summer film series.
- A Pre-Christmas and in the Twelve Days of Christmas: children's pantomime, such as Peter Pan, Snow White etc.

=== Seasonal tours and productions ===
To date the theatre has hosted opera, dance, drama and comedy as its main acts.

In January 2009 the Playhouse celebrated its 25th anniversary with a specially commissioned production of Smokey Joe's Cafe.

== Location ==
The Playhouse (as it is locally referred to) is in the south-western end of Epsom town centre, adjoining the Ashley Shopping Centre and car park. It was built as part of the Ashley Centre development in the early 1980s, opening in 1984. It is currently managed by Epsom and Ewell Borough Council.

== Amenities ==
Main auditorium, seating 406 people

- The Myers studio theatre

This seats up to 80 people and is used for jazz events, children's shows and community events

- Public bar and bistro, and a small private bar for hire
- Box office, toilets and reception areas.
