= The Pavilions =

Coordinates: 51.5465°N 0.4811°W

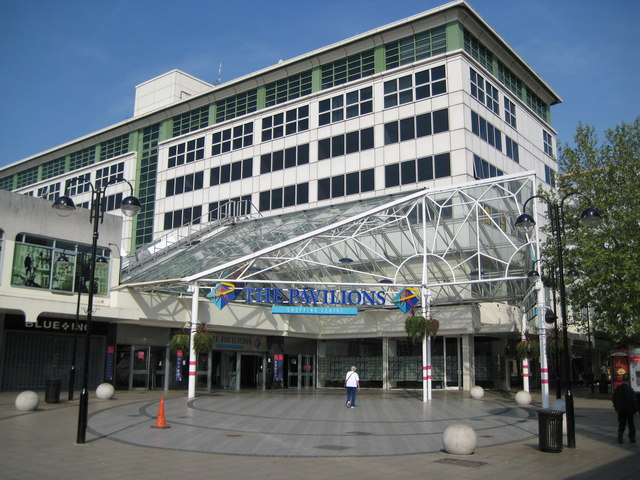
- The Pavilions Shopping Centre in 2008
- Location: Uxbridge, England
- Manager: LaSalle Investment Management
- Num. of stores: 60
- Floor area: 360,000 sq ft (33,000 m^{2})
- Floors: 1
- Parking: 1,150
- Website: www.thepavilions.co.uk

The Pavilions is an indoor shopping centre in Uxbridge, Greater London, England. It was opened in 1973 and refurbished in 1985 and has previously been known as the Pavilions Shopping Centre and before that, The Cedars Shopping Centre. Between 2005 and 2013, the centre was known as The Mall Pavilions while under the ownership of The Mall Fund.

== History ==
The centre was built around the town's market square, the location of the historic Uxbridge Market chartered in 1180, and a number of market stalls remain in operation within the centre. A lack of shelter meant it became unpopular and did not attract the levels of custom hoped for. Many buildings along the High Street and Windsor Street had been demolished to make way for the new precinct. It was eventually sold to the Prudential Assurance Company and was redeveloped with a roof to become the Pavilions Shopping Centre. The new roof was built during the early 1980s and as part of the redevelopment, The Peacock public house in one of the two main squares was demolished and replaced with a cafe named The Chequers which remains.

In 2005, the Mall Fund purchased the shopping centre and three others from Prudential Property Investment Managers for a total of £550 million. The Mall Fund sold the centre to LaSalle Investment Management for £64.5 million in July 2013.
