= Ankerside Shopping Centre =

Shopping centre in Tamworth, England

Coordinates: 52.63245°N 1.69333°W

Ankerside Shopping Centre is a shopping centre in Tamworth, Staffordshire. It is located beside the River Anker. It is now owned by Tamworth Borough Council, which acquired it from previous owners REI Nederland B.V. on 29 November 2024. The council appointed NewRiver to provide asset management and strategic advice on the centre.

== History ==
The shopping centre was opened by Elizabeth II on 6 June 1980. In 2021, a local artist was commissioned to create a Saxon themed mural on the wall of the Ankerside multi-storey car park.

In 2025, Tamworth Borough Council began a strategic review of the Ankerside Shopping Centre to assess its performance and consider options for its longer-term future. NewRiver was appointed to produce a business plan and strategic review as part of the process.
