= Swansgate Shopping Centre =

Shopping centre in Wellingborough, England

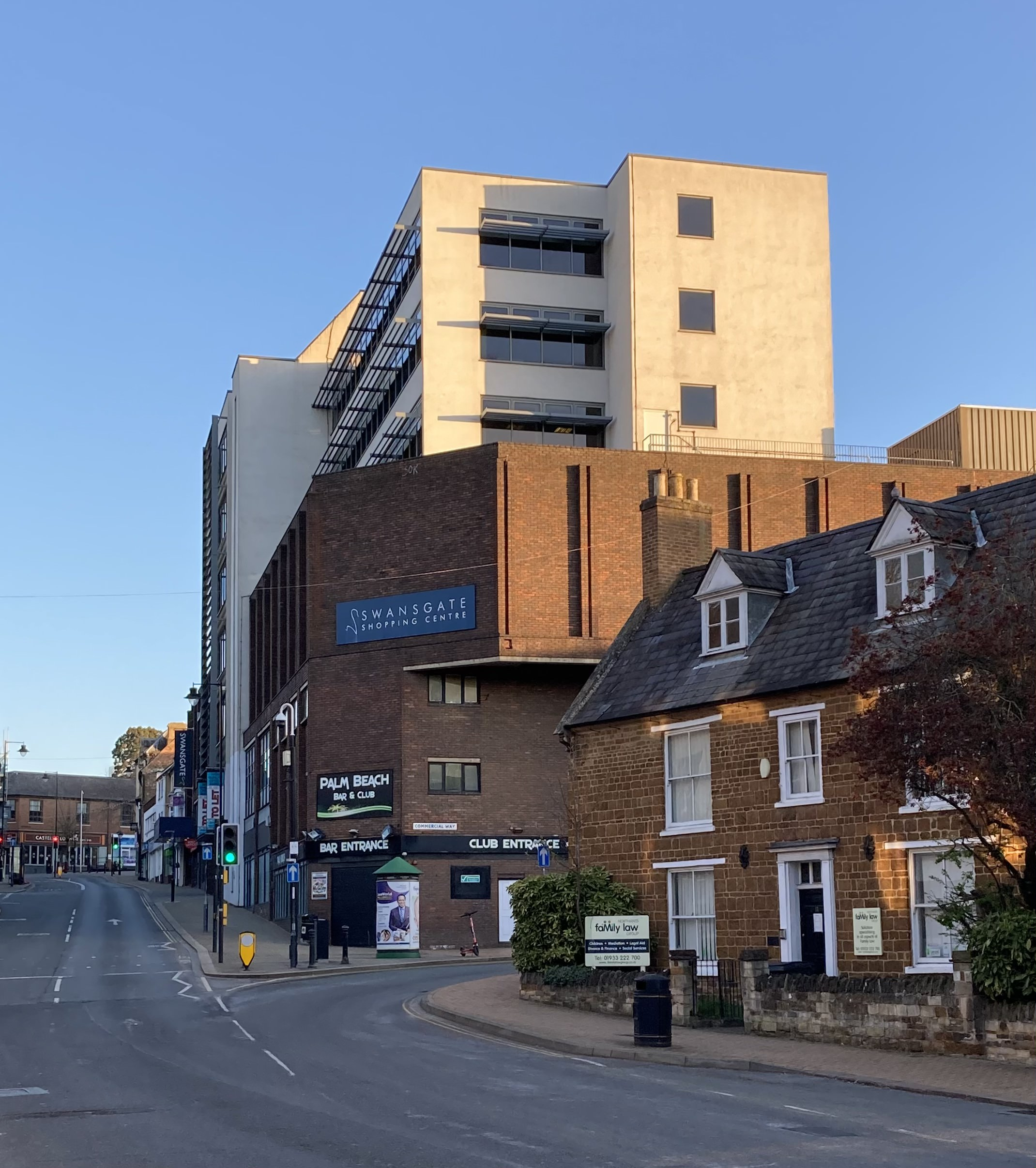
- Sheep Street entrance
- Location: Wellingborough, England
- Coordinates: 52°18′01″N 0°41′31″W
- Opened: 1977; 49 years ago
- Developer: Arndale Property Trust
- Owner: North Northamptonshire Council
- Num. of stores: 50
- Floors: 2 (6 in Office Tower)
- Parking: 1000 spaces
- Website: swansgateshoppingcentre.com

The Swansgate Shopping Centre is a shopping centre in the town centre of Wellingborough, Northamptonshire, England. It is the second largest shopping centre in Northamptonshire after the Grosvenor Centre in Northampton. It was built in the mid-1970s, opening in June 1977 and was originally known as the Arndale Centre, until being renamed Swansgate in 1997.

== Shops ==
There are over 50 shops including Boots, TGJones, Superdrug, and Poundland.
