= Frasers Plus Luton =

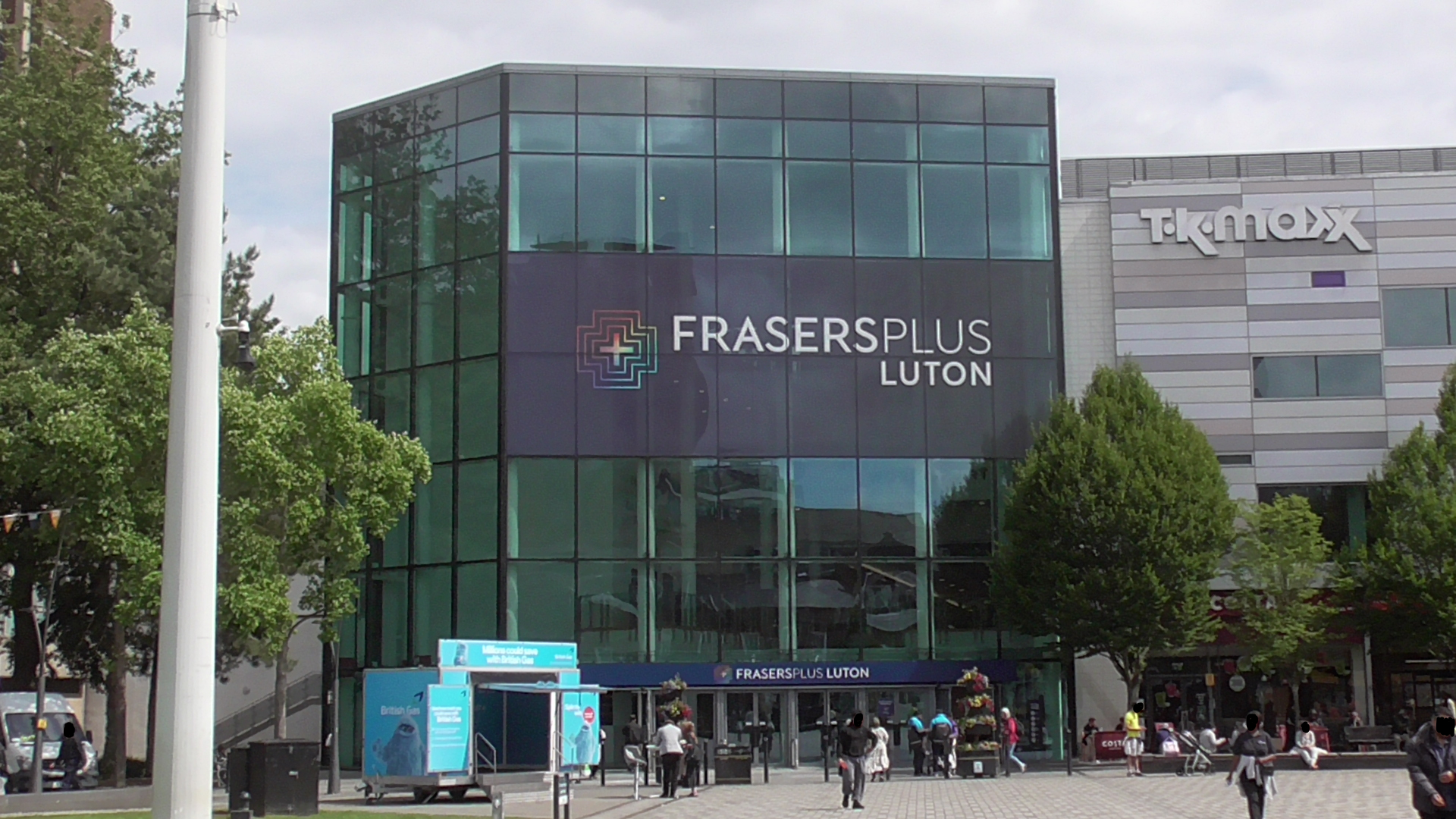
- Entrance to Frasers Plus Luton
- Location: Luton, Bedfordshire, United Kingdom
- Coordinates: 51°52′45″N 0°24′54″W
- Opened: 1972; 54 years ago
- Manager: Roy Greening
- Owner: Frasers Group
- Num. of stores: 128
- Floor area: 906,850 sq ft (84,249 m^{2})
- Floors: 2
- Parking: 1,707 spaces
- Website: https://lutonfrasersplus.co.uk/

Frasers Plus Luton is a shopping centre in Luton, Bedfordshire, England. It was formerly an Arndale Centre, until it was purchased by Capital & Regional in January 2006. It was temporarily called The Mall Arndale, but was later referred to as The Mall Luton, although local people still refer to it as "The Arndale". It was renamed Luton Point in 2024, and to Frasers Plus Luton in 2026.

== History ==
Originally opened in 1972, as The Arndale Shopping Centre, it was purchased by Capital & Regional in January 2006. The centre has 147 shop units occupying 906,850 sq ft (84,249 m^{2}), and parking for 1,707 cars.

The area that would become the new shopping centre was cleared during the 1960s. Many notable buildings which had escaped the damage of World War II were subsequently demolished.

=== St George's Square ===
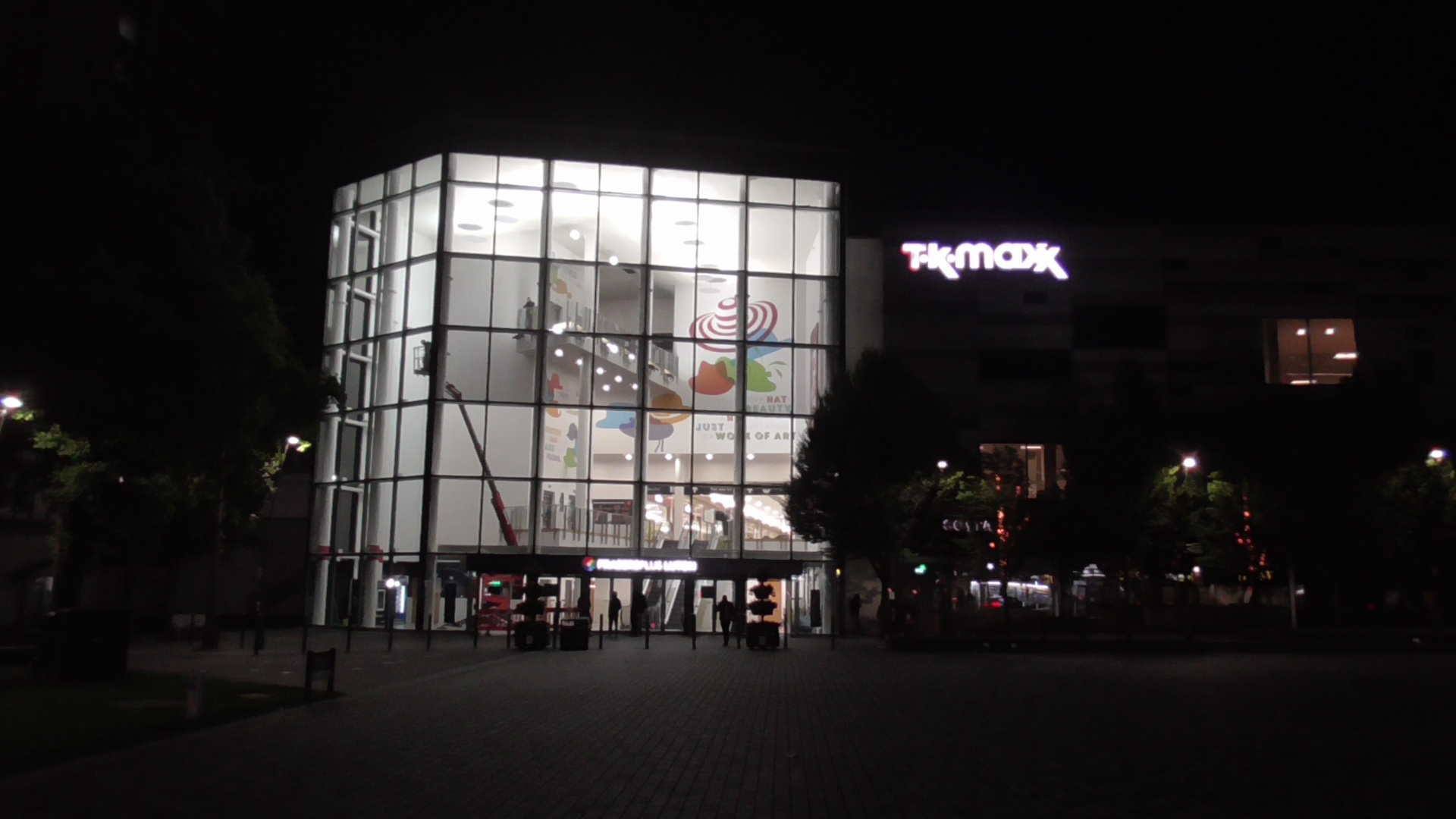
Frasers Plus Luton late at night

Following the completion of the redevelopment of St George's Square in Luton, the St George's Square end of The Mall Luton was also remodelled.

The development created 8,825 sq m (75,000 sq ft) of new retail space across 8 new retail units. Three levels of car parking at the top of the development provided an increase of approximately 200 car parking spaces. On completion The Mall Luton totalled 77,199 sq m (831,000 sq ft). The new six-storey building has an entrance directly onto St George's Square, with escalators inside the building taking shoppers to the main mall level.

Ken Ford, chief executive of The Mall, said, when the scheme was announced:

"Our proposals will provide enhanced retail units in order to improve the retail offer in the town. They will also improve The Mall Luton's relationship with the town – by providing bright, modern shop fronts and a landmark new entrance we will vastly improve the Mall's presence onto St George's Square and help create an attractive area for the people of Luton to shop, eat and relax."

TK Maxx was the new anchor tenant for the extension, with Argos also taking a unit. Completion of the St George's Square redevelopment was planned for September 2009. However, due to the recession, the funding was delayed. The redevelopment was eventually completed in 2012.

== Extension plans ==
=== The Northern Gateway ===
In December 2007, a further planning application was submitted for a much larger extension to The Mall. As well as several much larger shopping units, housing and office space was planned. The site is between The Mall and train station, and would see total redevelopment of Silver Street, Bute Street, one side of Cheapside and Part of Guildford Street.

Although much of the site is either car parking or vacant, two grade II listed buildings and several locally listed buildings would be demolished, including several 19th-century hat factories, for which the town was once famous.

The plan was criticised by English Heritage and the Victorian Society. Following the comments The Mall stated that following discussions with council officers, "amendments to the application are being made".
