= Cleveland Centre =

Shopping centre in Middlesbrough, North Yorkshire, England

- Location: Middlesbrough, North Yorkshire, England
- Coordinates: 54.5744°N 1.2360°W
- Address: 85 Grange Road, Middlesbrough TS1 2LS
- Opened: 1970
- Previous names: The Mall (2004–2014)
- Manager: Praxis Real Estate Management
- Owner: Middlesbrough Council
- Num. of stores: 63
- Floor area: 421,000 square feet (39,100 m^{2})
- Parking: 600 spaces
- Website: clevelandcentre.co.uk

The Cleveland Centre is the largest retail complex in Middlesbrough, North Yorkshire, England, comprising roughly a third of the town centre's retail space.

== History ==
The Cleveland Centre opened in stages, Phase 1 during August 1970, following the demolition of six local streets within the heart of the town. Phase 2 followed in 1972 and expanded the centre to include roughly 50 shops, with a Boots and Tesco store subsequently. In 2004 The Mall Fund acquired the Cleveland Centre and rebranded it the Mall, Middlesbrough. This name change lasted until 2014. In 2022, during a turbulent economic period, Middlesbrough Council bought the shopping centre for £12 million, citing that they would use it to "breathe new life" into the town.

=== HMS Endeavour replica ===
In 1984, a 25-foot (7.6 m) scale model of Captain James Cook's HMS Endeavour was suspended from the ceiling of the centre, becoming a prominent local landmark. The replica was taken down during renovations in 2005 and spent 15 years in storage before briefly returning in 2020 to mark the 250th anniversary of Cook's 1770 landings in New Zealand and Australia. In April 2025, the model was brought out of storage again for a planned six-week exhibition; following strong public interest, the centre extended the display.

== Stores and facilities ==
The Cleveland Centre has a range of stores including a TJ Hughes Department Store, Iceland, New Look, Lush and Post Office. It also includes The Live Well Centre which provides advice on housing and benefits along with a focus on health. In 2026, Middlesbrough Council announced plans to expand public services inside the complex with a new employment hub alongside the Live Well Centre, following the relocation of long-standing tenant Boots to the nearby Hill Street Centre.

== Transport ==
Middlesbrough railway station is about 10 minutes walk north. The Centre also has a dedicated bus stop on the Arriva North East Routes.
