= The Ashley Centre =

Shopping and office center in Epsom, Surrey, England

Coordinates: 51.332°N 0.269°W

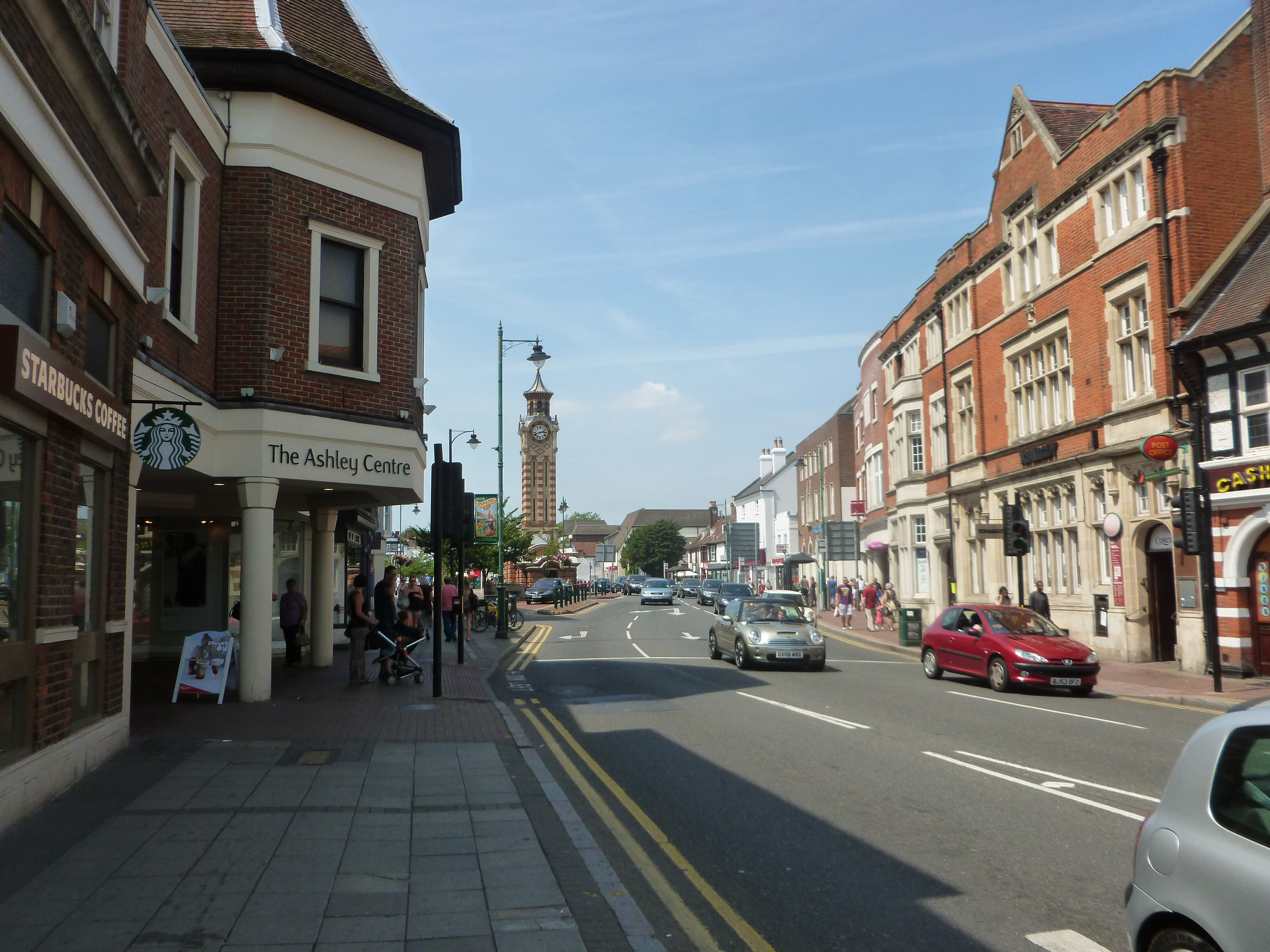
- Location: Epsom, Surrey, England
- Address: Ashley House Annex, Ashley Road
- Opened: 24 October 1984; 42 years ago
- Architect: Humphrey Wood
- Website: www.theashleycentre.co.uk

The Ashley Centre (from 2005-2009 as The Mall Ashley) is a shopping centre, in Epsom, Surrey.

The Ashley Centre was opened on 24 October 1984 by Queen Elizabeth II as The Ashley Centre, a development combined of shops, a multi-storey car park, office space and a theatre space. In 2005, it was acquired by The Mall Fund and rebranded throughout as The Mall Ashley. In 2009, the centre was sold again and purchased by Bride Hall Group. It was relaunched in April 2009 and has now reverted to the original name of The Ashley Centre.

== Development ==
The centre was designed to have minimal impact on the streetscape of Epsom High Street, as it incorporated many of the traditional older buildings that existed along the High Street - for example the old Lester Bowden shop and Marks & Spencer's marketplace entrances. The taller buildings of the centre are located furthest from the marketplace so as to not be intrusive to the older buildings of the town. These are the service facilities and the car park. Anchor stores on opening were Army & Navy Stores (later rebranded as Dickens & Jones and later House of Fraser) and Marks & Spencer.

Epsom town centre was later given a one-way system, built to ease the flow of traffic around and through the town, and to fit in with the entrance/exit requirements of the new multi-storey car park.

In 2006, a major redesign of the centre was undertaken, to incorporate space for a large new Boots store in the centre. This took over the space previously occupied by Kings' Shade Walk, a shorter mall corridor linking the centre to Epsom marketplace.

In 2009 the toilet and baby change facilities at the centre were revamped to give better access for disabled/less-able customers.

== Transport ==
Bus links are provided from Reigate, Redhill, Guildford, Leatherhead, Tadworth, Crawley, Dorking, Bookham, Banstead, Kingston upon Thames, Surbiton, Tolworth, Chessington, Ewell, Worcester Park, Cheam, Sutton, St Helier, Morden, Colliers Wood, Chipstead, Coulsdon, Purley, South Croydon and Croydon into Epsom town centre, with The Ashley Centre being located opposite the main stops by the Clock Tower.

The Ashley Centre provides a multi-storey car park and offers Shopmobility for less-able visitors to the centre. The centre is a five-minute walk from Epsom railway station.

== Bibliography ==
- Abdy, Charles (2001). Epsom Past. Bognor Regis: Phillimore. ISBN 978-18-6-077180-4.
