= The Mall Maidstone =

Coordinates: 51°16′23″N 0°31′34″E

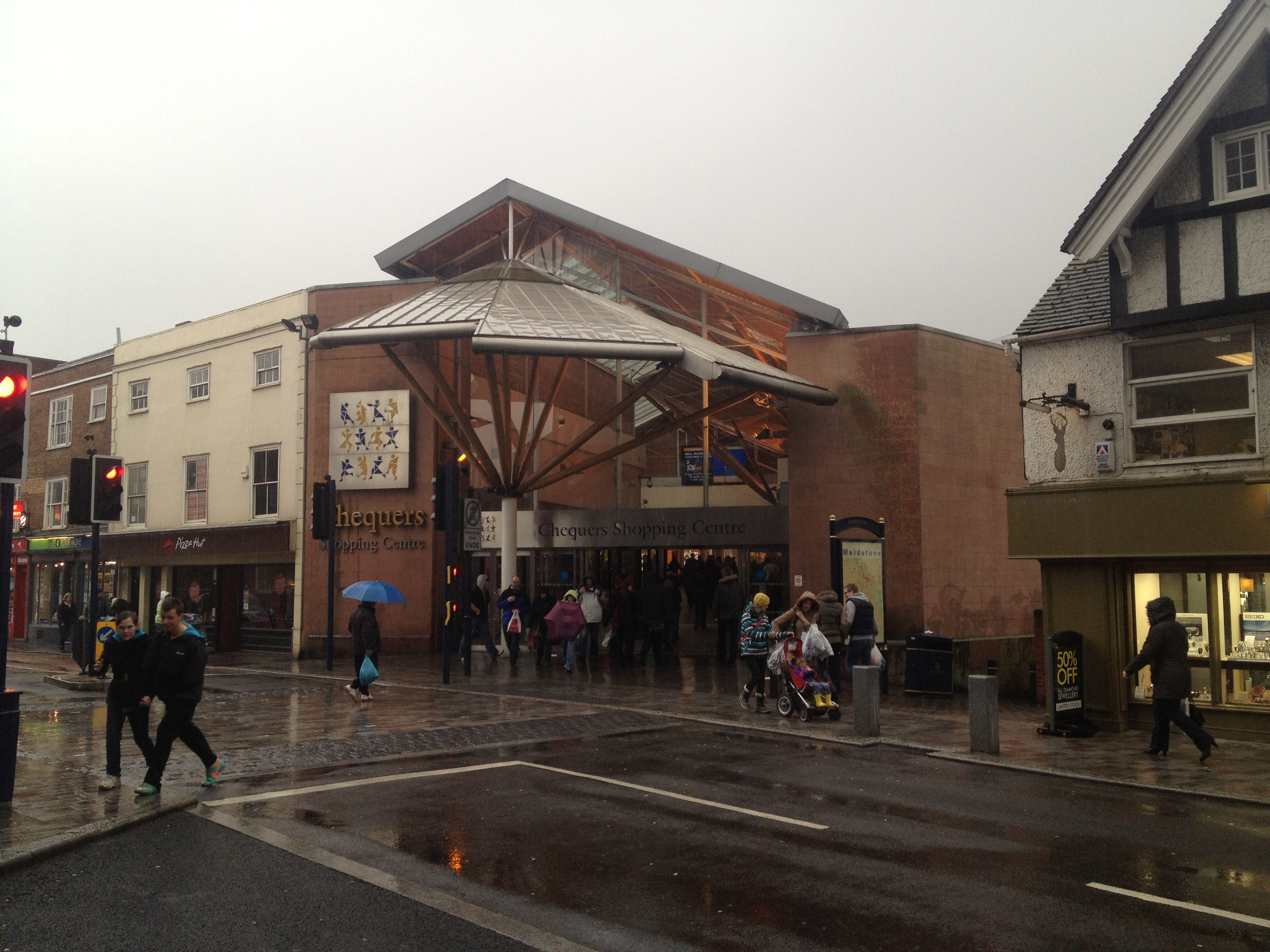
- Entrance to The Mall from Week Street, Maidstone
- Location: Maidstone, Kent
- Address: The Mall Maidstone, Pads Hill, Maidstone, Kent
- Opened: 1976
- Owner: Capital & Regional
- Num. of stores: 101
- Floor area: 535,000 sq ft (49,700 m^{2})
- Floors: 3
- Parking: 1,040 spaces
- Website: www.themall.co.uk/maidstone/

The Mall Maidstone (originally known as The Stoneborough Centre, subsequently Chequers Shopping Centre and then The Mall Chequers) is a covered shopping centre in Maidstone, the county town of Kent. The centre has 535,000 square feet (49,700 m^{2}) of floor space, ranking it as the joint 60th largest shopping centre in the UK according to a 2008 survey by Retail Week.

Together with the Fremlin Walk shopping centre, which is uncovered, it is one of the two primary shopping venues within the town centre.

== History ==
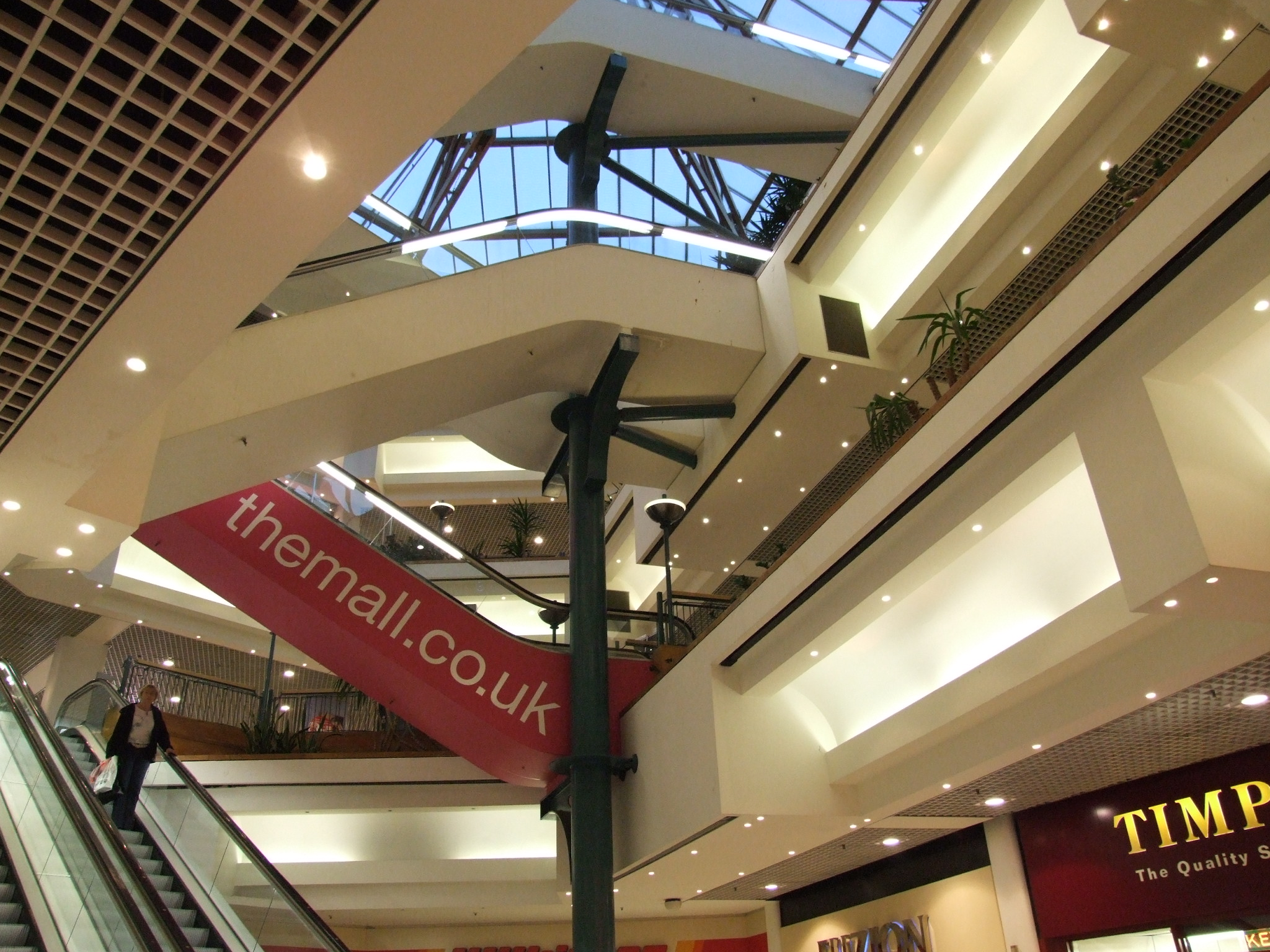
View from the lower level of The Mall Maidstone

The Mall Maidstone was built in 1976 as the 'Stoneborough Centre,' with a 7-storey office block on the top, named 'Stoneborough House.' In the 1990s, the shopping centre was rebranded as 'Chequers Shopping Centre,' to coincide with works on the main entrances and refurbishment work that was going on at the time. The office block above retained its original name.

The centre opened with a Sainsbury's supermarket, which closed and relocated to a separate building immediately east of the bus station in 2000.

In 2005, the centre was purchased by Capital & Regional, who once again set about refurbishing the centre with their own, distinctive pink corporate branding. An agreement was subsequently signed that Maidstone Borough Council would move into the office block on top of the centre, after extensive refurbishment of that, and the construction of a 'Gateway' reception area. The council signed a 99-year lease and took up residence in May 2007, with the block renamed 'Maidstone House'.

Today, The Mall Maidstone hosts a wide variety of shops, from independent retailers to big chain names like B&M. It is a key part of the town centre, also containing the Chequers Bus Station, retaining the old name, which serves as the main bus terminus for the town.

=== Chequers Bus Station ===
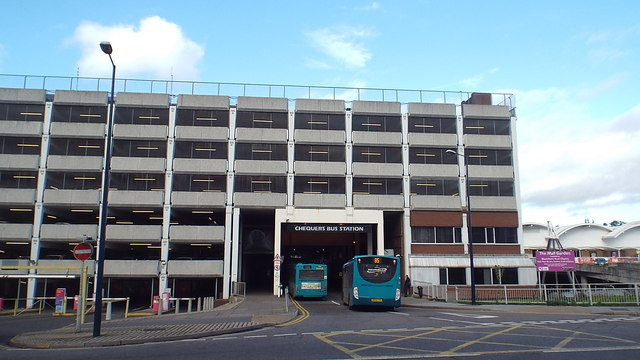
Entrance to the Chequers bus station

The town's main bus station is housed within the building, between the main shopping area and the Sainsbury's supermarket. The station takes the form of a two-way "tunnel" underneath the car park levels. Stops H1 to H5 are on the west side, and stops J1 to J6 are on the east side. There was also an Arriva travel shop which had closed in 2012. It is now occupied by a charity, Involve Kent.

The main operators are Arriva Southern Counties and Nu-Venture.

Buses run from the bus station to several destinations in the Maidstone area such as Barming and Park Wood. Buses also travel to destinations outside the local area such as the Medway Towns and Sittingbourne.

The bus station is managed by Maidstone Borough Council.
