= Margaret Ford, Baroness Ford =

Scottish businesswoman, life peer (born 1957)

The Right Honourable The Baroness Ford LVO OBE FRSE

Member of the House of Lords
- Lord Temporal
- Life peerage 5 June 2006 – 18 December 2025

Personal details
- Born: Margaret Anne Garland; 16 December 1957 (age 68)
- Party: Labour; Crossbench
- Spouse(s): (1) Christopher Derek Ford; (2) David Arthur Bolger
- Children: 2
- Education: University of Glasgow (MA (Hons) MPhil)

Margaret Anne Ford, Baroness Ford (born 16 December 1957) is a Scottish businesswoman, life peer and former member of the House of Lords. She was nominated by Tony Blair as a Labour Peer in 2006, but resigned the Labour Whip in 2009 and then sat as a Crossbencher. She is Chair of London Gatwick Airport and Chair of The Centre for Public Interest Audit.

== Life ==
Ford was born in Saltcoats, Ayrshire, in December 1957. The daughter of Edward and Susan Garland, she received education at St Michael's Academy in Kilwinning and Glasgow University. She graduated MA (Hons) in 1979 and M.Phil in 1984.

She married Christopher Derek Ford in 1982, with whom she had two children, Michael and Katharine. After a divorce in 1990, she married David Arthur Bolger later that same year.

== Career ==
Ford is Chair of London Gatwick Airport, and in July 2024 she was announced as the inaugural Chair of the Centre for Public Interest Audit, a thinktank dedicated to audit quality research.

She is the former Chair of NewRiver REIT, STV PLC, of Grainger plc, of May Gurney plc, and of Barchester Healthcare. Grainger was the first Company listed on the LSE which had an all female leadership team with Ford appointing women to the positions of CEO, CFO and SID.

She has also chaired the Buckingham Palace Reservicing Challenge Board, Lothian Health Board, English Partnerships (now Homes England) and the Olympic Park Legacy Company (now LLDC). In 2011, she was included in the Times newspaper Sport Power 100, entering at number 26. In 2012 she was controversially replaced as chairman of the LLDC by Daniel Moylan, a Conservative.

She has served as a non executive Director of the Scottish Prison Service, of Ofgem, Thus plc, Serco plc, Segro plc, and Taylor Wimpey plc.

Ford was also the inaugural Chair of Deloitte UK’s Audit Governance Board, and was an Independent Non-Executive Member of the Deloitte UK Oversight Board, Deloitte North and South Europe Board, and the Deloitte Global Independent Non-Executive Advisory Council. She stepped down from these positions on 31 October 2023 to join Gatwick Airport as its Chair.

Her main executive roles were at BIFU, Price Waterhouse, Scottish Homes, and as the founding CEO of Eglinton Management Centre. She sold Eglinton in 2000 and in the same year, set up Good Practice, the online publisher (which was sold to Emerald Publishing in 2015). Her last executive role was at Royal Bank of Canada as Managing Director (DCM) in the Social infrastructure Division.

In September 2023, she was announced as the new Chair of London Gatwick Airport.

== Honours ==
Ford was raised to the Peerage as Baroness Ford, of Cunninghame in North Ayrshire on 11 July 2006. She was appointed as an honorary member of the RICS in 2009. In 2015 she was elected as a Fellow of the Royal Society of Edinburgh. She was appointed an Officer of the Order of the British Empire (OBE) for services to business and sport in 2019, and holds Honorary degrees from Napier University and the University of Stirling. Ford was appointed a Lieutenant of the Royal Victorian Order in the 2025 New Year Honours.

== Voluntary ==
Ford has been Honorary President of the charity Epilepsy Action since 2008, a Trustee of the British Olympic Association and a Councillor of the LTA. She was formerly a Chair of the STV Children's Appeal and Trustee and Chair of the Tennis Foundation, prior to its merger with the LTA in 2019.
