= The Mall Blackburn =

Coordinates: 53.7487°N 2.4826°W

- Location: Blackburn, Lancashire, England
- Opened: 1967
- Owner: Adhan Group
- Num. of stores: 110
- Num. of anchor tenants: Primark; B&M; Next
- Floors: 2
- Parking: 1304
- Website: www.themallblackburn.co.uk

The Mall Blackburn, also known by its former name, Blackburn Shopping Centre, is a shopping centre serving the town of Blackburn, Lancashire, England and is owned by the Adhan Group.

== History ==
The shopping centre was built in three phases, with the final phase opening in 1979. The centre was refurbished in 1995, during which the lower floor of the former Co-Operative Department Store was transformed into the Ainsworth Mall.

The centre was bought by Standard Life in 1993 and its name was subsequently changed to Blackburn Shopping Centre. Standard Life sold the centre in 2003 to Reit Asset Management.

In 2004, Reit Asset Management sold the centre to The Mall Fund. The centre was sold again in 2022 to the Adhan Group from The Mall Fund for £40 million.

=== Modernisation ===
A local newspaper, the Lancashire Telegraph, launched a campaign in June 2002 to have Lord Square in the shopping centre bulldozed, which drew attention from the public. In October 2003, the centre’s then owners, Reit Asset Management, announced plans for the redevelopment of the square.

Further proposals for a revamp of the centre were put forward in January 2004, when the then owners of the centre lodged plans to redevelop the centre. However, when the Mall Company purchased the centre they scrapped the proposed redevelopment plans.

Demolition of the centre began in early 2008. In August of that year, progress on the redevelopment of the shopping centre was criticised by local business owners. The contractors (Balfour Beatty), who originally demolished the square, had withdrawn from rebuilding it, and no new contractor had been appointed four months later. New contractors, (Taylor Woodrow), were appointed in September 2008 by the shopping centre owners. The revamped centre was eventually opened in 2010. It features new shops and areas, as well as television screens, Ask Me points and other enhanced features.

== Transport links ==
The shopping centre is located in the centre of Blackburn and is a short walk to:

- Blackburn railway station
- Taxi ranks
- Blackburn Bus Station

== See also ==
- Blackburn
- The Mall Company
