= NewRiver =

NewRiver REIT plc
- Type: REIT
- Traded as: LSE: NRR
- Industry: Property
- Founded: 2009
- Headquarters: London, England, UK
- Key people: Margaret Ford (Chairman); Allan Lockhart (CEO)
- Revenue: ▲£131.0 million (2026)
- Operating income: ▲£44.4 million (2026)
- Net income: ▲£31.7 million (2026)
- Website: www.nrr.co.uk

NewRiver REIT plc is a specialist listed real estate investment trust (REIT), focused primarily on retail and leisure property. The company owns 33 shopping centres, 25 retail warehouses, 14 high street units and over 700 public houses. The company is listed on the London Stock Exchange.

== History ==
The company was established by Allan Lockhart and David Lockhart as a property company focusing on the retail sector under the name NewRiver Retail in September 2008. The company was the subject of an initial public offering on the London Stock Exchange in September 2009.

In 2009 Mark Davies, the then-husband (divorced in 2017) of the Conservative MP Mims Davies joined the company as finance director. The company have since donated to her "local party organisation or indirectly via a central party organisation"

The company acquired 202 pubs from Marston's for £90 million in December 2013 and 158 pubs from Punch Taverns for £53.5 million in August 2015. The company altered its structure and changed its name to NewRiver REIT in July 2016.

In February 2018, David Lockhart stepped down as CEO and was replaced by Allan Lockhart. David Lockhart became Executive Deputy Chairman.

In 2024, NewRiver acquired Ellandi and absorbed it into the company.

In September 2024, the company made a takeover offer for Capital & Regional worth £147 million. The transaction was completed three months later.

== Operations ==
The company owns, manages and operates numerous shopping centres.

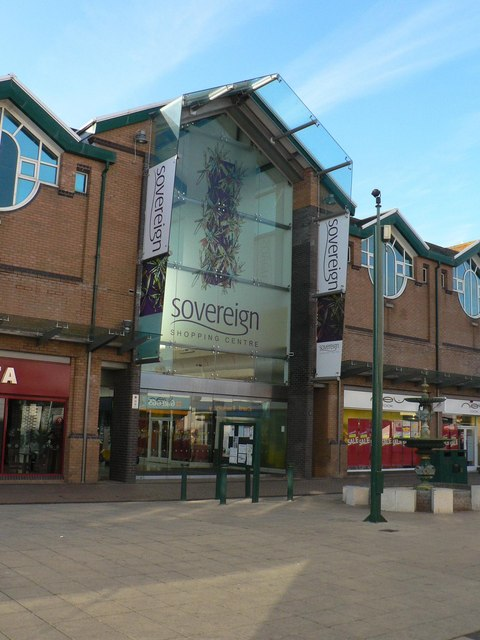
Sovereign Shopping Centre, Boscombe

- Ladysmith Shopping Centre, Ashton-under-Lyne,
- Broadway Shopping Centre, Bexleyheath,
- Houndshill Shopping Centre, Blackpool,
- Strand Shopping Centre, Bootle,
- Sovereign Shopping Centre, Boscombe,
- The Promenades Shopping Centre, Bridlington,
- The Martlets Shopping Centre, Burgess Hill,
- The Riverside, Canterbury,
- Whitefriars Shopping Centre, Canterbury,
- Capitol Centre, Cardiff,
- Merlin's Walk, Carmarthen,
- Pentagon Shopping Centre, Chatham,
- Culver Square Shopping Centre, Colchester,
- The Precinct, Coventry,
- Swan Centre, Eastleigh,
- The Gyle Shopping Centre, Edinburgh,
- Locks Heath Shopping Centre, Fareham,
- Princes Mead Shopping Centre, Farnborough,
- Grays Shopping Centre, Grays,
- The Friary, Guildford,
- Priory Meadow Shopping Centre, Hastings,
- Exchange Ilford, Ilford,
- Highcross Leicester, Leicester,
- The Mall, Maidstone,
- The Deeping Shopping Centre, Market Deeping,
- Hillstreet Shopping Centre, Middlesbrough,
- Midsummer Place, Milton Keynes,
- The Avenue, Newton Mearns,
- Gloucester Green, Oxford,
- The Piazza, Paisley,
- The Moor, Sheffield,
- Hildreds Centre, Skegness
- Ankerside Shopping Centre, Tamworth
- 17&Central, Walthamstow
- Three Horseshoes Walk, Warminster
- Horsefair Shopping Centre, Wisbech
- Newlands Shopping Centre, Whitham
- The Mall, Wood Green
