= Capital & Regional =

British property asset manager

Capital & Regional plc
- Company type: Public
- Traded as: LSE: CAL
- Industry: Property
- Founded: 1979
- Headquarters: London, England, UK
- Key people: Hugh Scott-Barrett, Chairman; Lawrence Hutchings, CEO
- Revenue: ▲£59.0 million (2023)
- Operating income: ▼£9.5 million (2023)
- Net income: ▼£3.7 million (2023)
- Website: www.capreg.com

Capital & Regional plc was a large British manager of property assets - mainly shopping centres - for funds in which it has a significant stake, until it was acquired by NewRiver in December 2024.

== History ==
The company was founded in 1979 as Capital & Regional Properties. It was floated on the Unlisted Securities Market in 1986. In 1993 it acquired the Trinity Shopping Centre in Aberdeen and in 1994 the Eldon Garden Shopping Centre in Newcastle upon Tyne. In 1997 it went on to buy the Sauchiehall Shopping Centre in Glasgow and in 1998 the Pallasades Shopping Centre in Birmingham.

In 2001 it established the Mall Fund and the Junction Fund with Morley Fund Management and in 2008 the company commenced negotiations for extra funding for the Mall Fund.

In September 2024, the company accepted a takeover offer from NewRiver worth £147 million. The transaction was completed three months later.

== Structure ==
The company has two divisions:

- Earnings business - property management
- Assets business - fund investing
