= Chapelfields (disambiguation) =

Chapelfields may refer to:

- Chapelfields, Coventry, a suburb of Coventry, West Midlands, England
- Chapelfield, a large indoor shopping mall located on the edge of Norwich city centre

== See also ==
- Chapel Field Christian School, a non-denominational Christian school located in Pine Bush, New York
