= Chapelfield well mass grave =

Mass grave in Norwich, England

Coordinates: 52.62543°N 1.29103°E

A mass grave, highly probable to have been created during the historically attested episode of antisemitic violence in Norwich on 6 February 1190 CE, existed in a medieval well in the Chapelfield area of the city underneath what is now the Chantry Place shopping centre. It contained seventeen individuals, of which eleven were children. At least five of the individuals were related to each other. All of the genetically-sequenced individuals were Ashkenazi Jews.

The well was discovered in September 2004 during excavation of the area for the shopping centre, and an investigation took place in 2011. The bones were reburied in Earlham Road Cemetery in 2013. The results of further DNA sequencing and analysis of six of the individuals were published in 2022.

== Background ==
Historical sources indicate that the Norwich Jewish community were descendants of Ashkenazi Jews from Rouen, Normandy. These people were invited to England by William the Conqueror after 1066. The site of the well is located just to the south of what was the medieval Jewish quarter of the city.

In 1144, the family of William of Norwich made the claim that local Jews were responsible for his murder. This argument was taken up by Thomas of Monmouth, and is the first documented invocation of the blood libel myth.

== History ==
In 1190, a wave of antisemitic riots occurred in England as a result of the beginning of the Third Crusade. Members of the Jewish community in Norwich were killed in one of these riots, which involved the targeting of households, though the number of people who were killed is unclear.

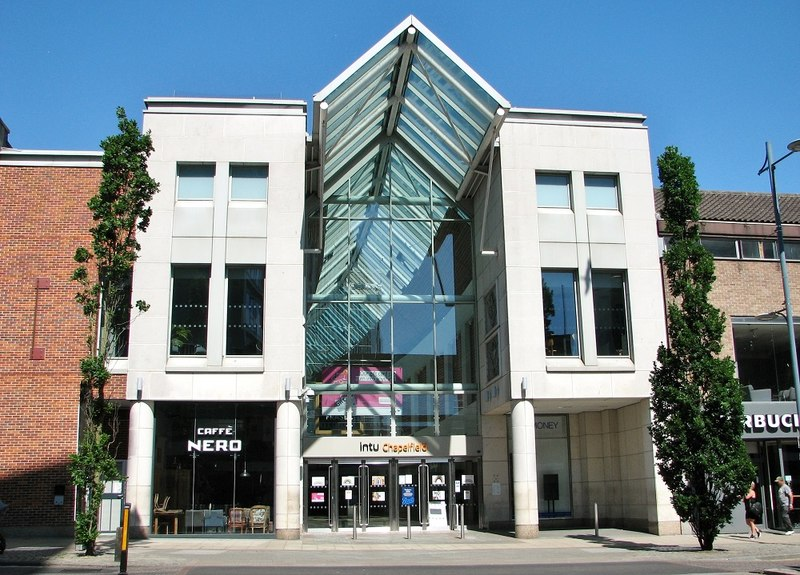
The well was discovered during construction of the Chapelfield shopping centre development

In September 2004, during the excavation of land for the Chapelfield shopping centre development in central Norwich, construction workers uncovered a human skull from the spoil of a pile trench in the development's north-eastern corner. Further archaeological excavations led to the discovery and excavation of the well, containing the commingled remains of at least 17 people. Giles Emery led this original excavation. The remains were put into storage for the time being.

An investigation concerning the well began years later, led by forensic anthropologist Sue Black of the University of Dundee's Centre for Anthropology and Human Identification. The investigation was filmed for an episode of the BBC programme History Cold Case which was broadcast on 23 June 2011.

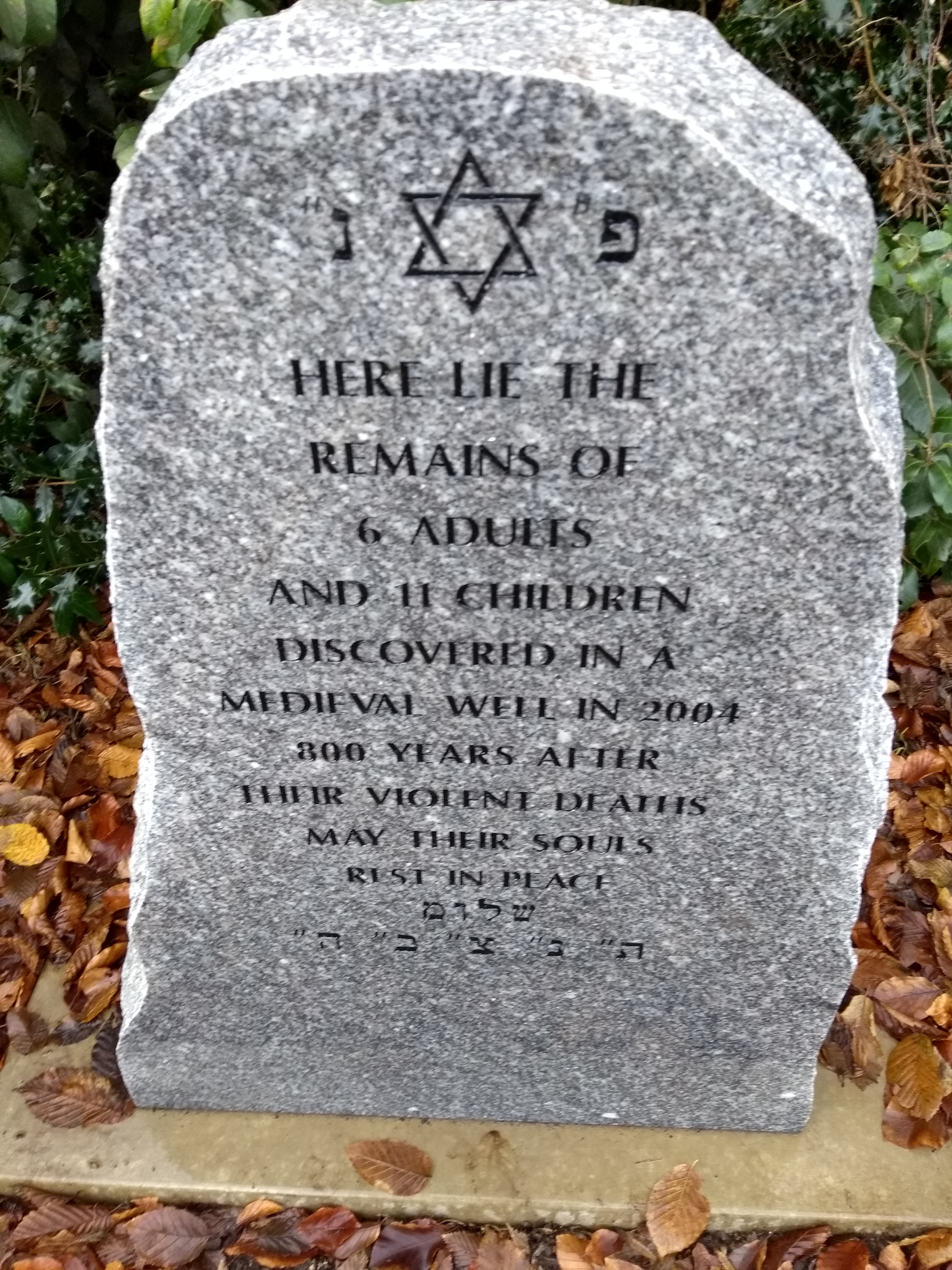
The bodies were reburied in Earlham Cemetery

In 2013, the bones were reburied in a Jewish cemetery in Norwich, despite uncertainty concerning the ancestry of the individuals at the time.

== Archaeological analysis ==
=== Dating ===
Pottery sherds recovered from the well were typologically dated to the 12th–14th centuries. Two initial attempts at radiocarbon dating on the skeletal remains placed them in the 11th–12th centuries. Further radiocarbon dating suggested that the bodies were deposited within the years 1161–1216, or 1165–1207. This is consistent with the only historically attested antisemitic massacre in Norwich, which occurred in 1190, and with the Great Revolt of 1174 CE during which time many people were killed during the sack of Norwich by Hugh Bigod.

=== Position of the bodies ===
The compaction of the remains within the well suggested that all the individuals in the grave had been deposited in a single event. Their skeletal articulation and completeness showed that they were put in the well as complete and intact bodies with little delay after their death. The bones of some of the bodies' legs were higher up in the sediment than the skulls from the same skeletons, which suggested that they had been put in the well head-first.

=== Osteological analysis ===
Osteological analysis found that the bodies included at least six adults and eleven sub-adults, of which there was one adolescent, two 10–15-year-olds, three 5–10-year-olds, three 3–5-year-olds and two children aged 0–3 years. Of the adults, there were both males and females. A lack of skeletal trauma consistent with the act of breaking a fall suggested that they had died before their bodies were deposited in the well. There was no sign of trauma to the bones that indicated a mass killing event beyond broken ribs, possibly caused when the bodies hit the bottom of the well. However, the individuals may have been killed in a manner that did not cause skeletal trauma. Some of the bones showed brown-black or gray-blue discolourations, as well as longitudinal splitting, suggesting either exposure to high temperatures or diagenesis and mineral staining.

=== DNA analysis ===
Initial DNA analysis was inconclusive on the ancestry of the individuals in the well. However, through later DNA sequencing of six of the individuals published in 2022, it was inferred that three of them – a 10- to 15-year-old, a young adult, and a 5- to 10-year-old – were full-sibling sisters. One other individual in the group appeared to be more distantly related to this group, and another was found to be distantly related to this fourth relative in turn. The related individuals had ancestry similar to modern Ashkenazi Jews, including four alleles which are associated with genetic disorders that were common in that community. One 0–3-year-old child was predicted to have had blue eyes and red hair.
