= Hertford Weir =

Weir on the River Lea in Hertfordshire, England

Coordinates: 51.8005°N 0.0746°W

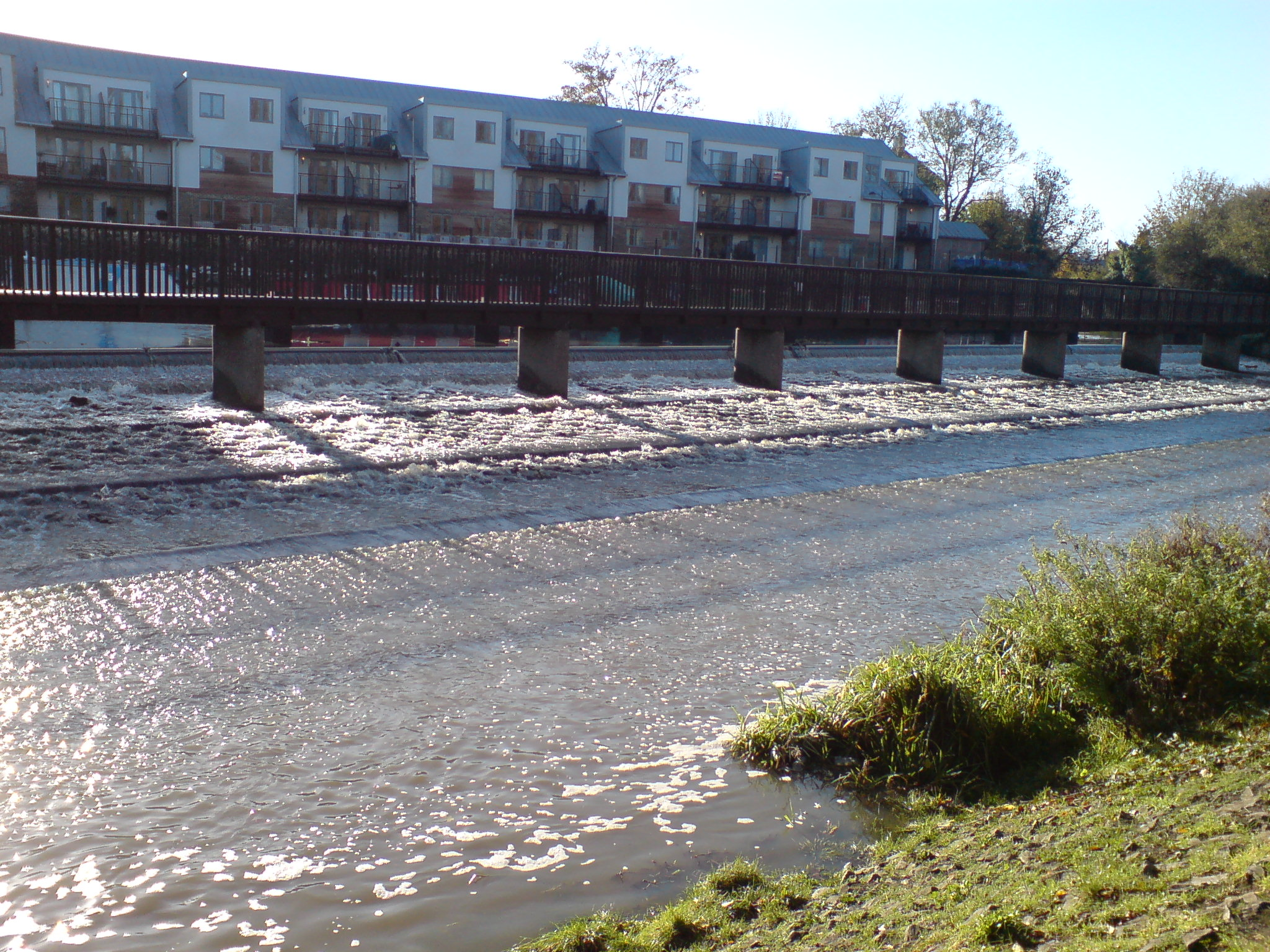
Hertford Weir in high water

Hertford Weir is a 65-meter weir on the River Lea, opposite the Hertford Basin marina and Hartham Common, in Hertford, England.
