= Castle Quarter =

The Castle Quarter may be:

- Castle Quarter (Cardiff)
- Castle Quarter (Buda)
- Castle Quarter, Norwich: a shopping centre in Norwich
