= Chantry Place =

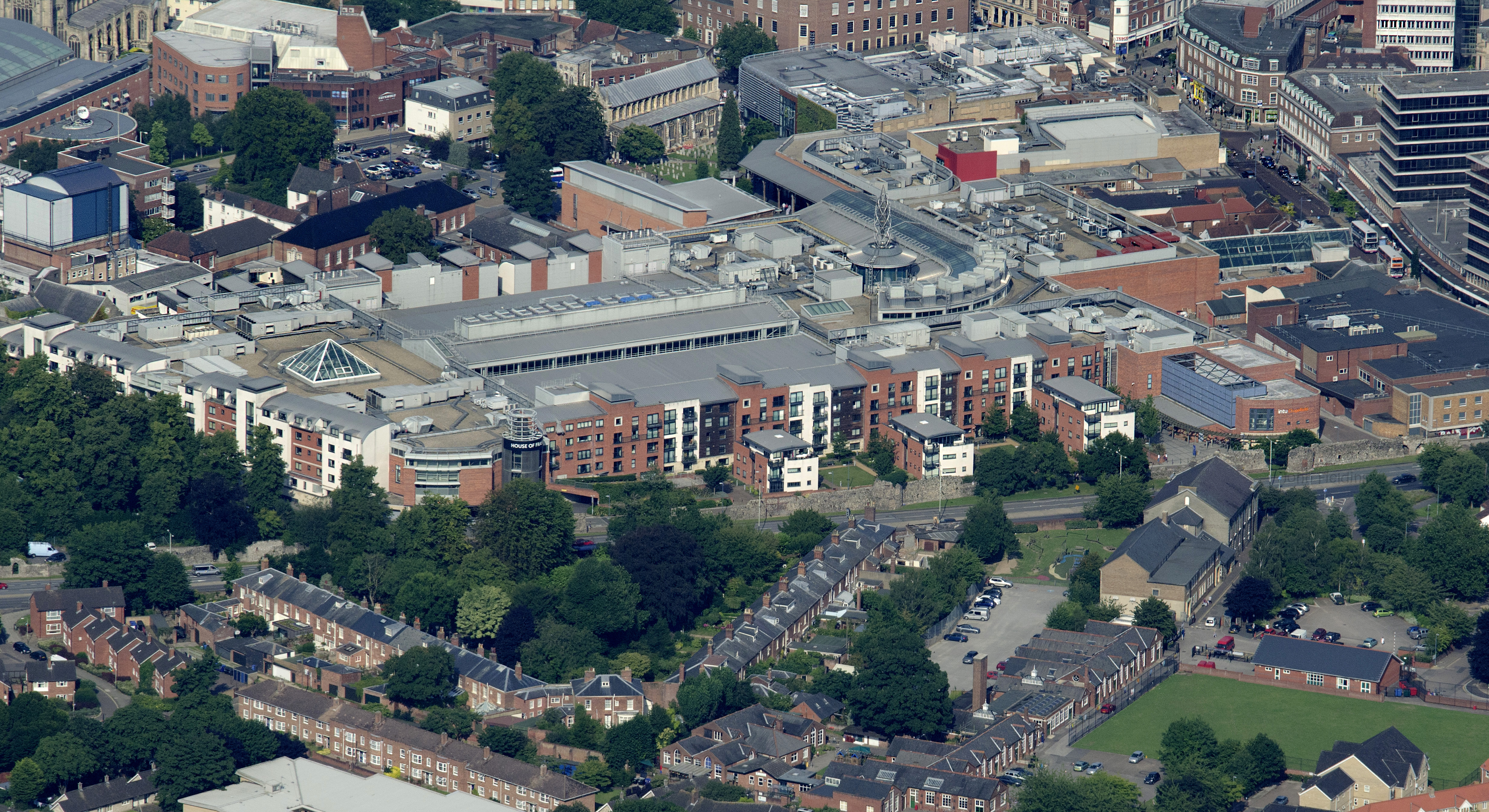
- Location: Norwich, England
- Coordinates: 52.62555°N 1.291045°E
- Address: 40-46 St Stephens Street
- Opened: 21 September 2005; 21 years ago
- Manager: Savills
- Owner: LaSalle Investment Management
- Floors: 3
- Parking: Multistory; 1000 spaces
- Website: chantryplace.co.uk

Chantry Place, formerly Intu Chapelfield and before that Chapelfield, is a shopping centre in Norwich city centre, on a site previously occupied by the Caleys (later Rowntree Mackintosh and Nestlé) chocolate factory.

As Chapelfield, the centre opened in 2005. It adopted Intu branding in 2013 following the renaming of its parent Capital Shopping Centres to become Intu Properties in line with most of the company's centres. Intu entered administration in June 2020 and Chapelfield transferred to new ownership in October that year, being renamed Chantry Place.

== History ==
The centre opened on Wednesday 21st September 2005, featuring a new three-floor flagship House of Fraser department store. It contained 80 shops and 17 cafés and restaurants.

Like many new retail developments, Chapelfield opened amid fanfare and local controversy, with a feeling in some quarters that the development brought little real value to the city centre, but instead was turning Norwich into another clone city, with another shopping centre already open in the city centre, Castle Mall (now renamed Castle Quarter).

Criticism was levelled at the new development that the 'new' shops are mostly stores that have re-located from elsewhere in the city centre. The developers responded, however, that 50 per cent of the stores were 'completely new to Norwich' including the only House of Fraser store in the region.

The centre was rebranded as "intu Chapelfield" in 2013 following the renaming of parent Capital Shopping Centres Group plc as "intu properties plc".

Intu Properties plc entered administration on 20 June 2020, and the centre transferred to new operators LaSalle Investment Management in October that year, managed by Savills. It received the new name of Chantry Place on 20 October 2020.

A well containing seventeen bodies, believed to be Jewish, was found in 2004 by workers preparing the site. The remains dating from 1150 to 1300 were buried at the city's Earlham Road Cemetery.

== Awards ==
The British Council of Shopping Centres awarded the centre its Gold Award for best In-Town Retail Scheme in 2006.

== Stores ==
Keystone stores in the centre include Frasers, Apple Store, Hollister Co. and H&M.

The centre's third floor, known as The Dining Terrace, comprises restaurants and cafes, including McDonald's, KFC and Subway.
