= Hertford Basin =

Coordinates: 51.8002°N 0.0745°W

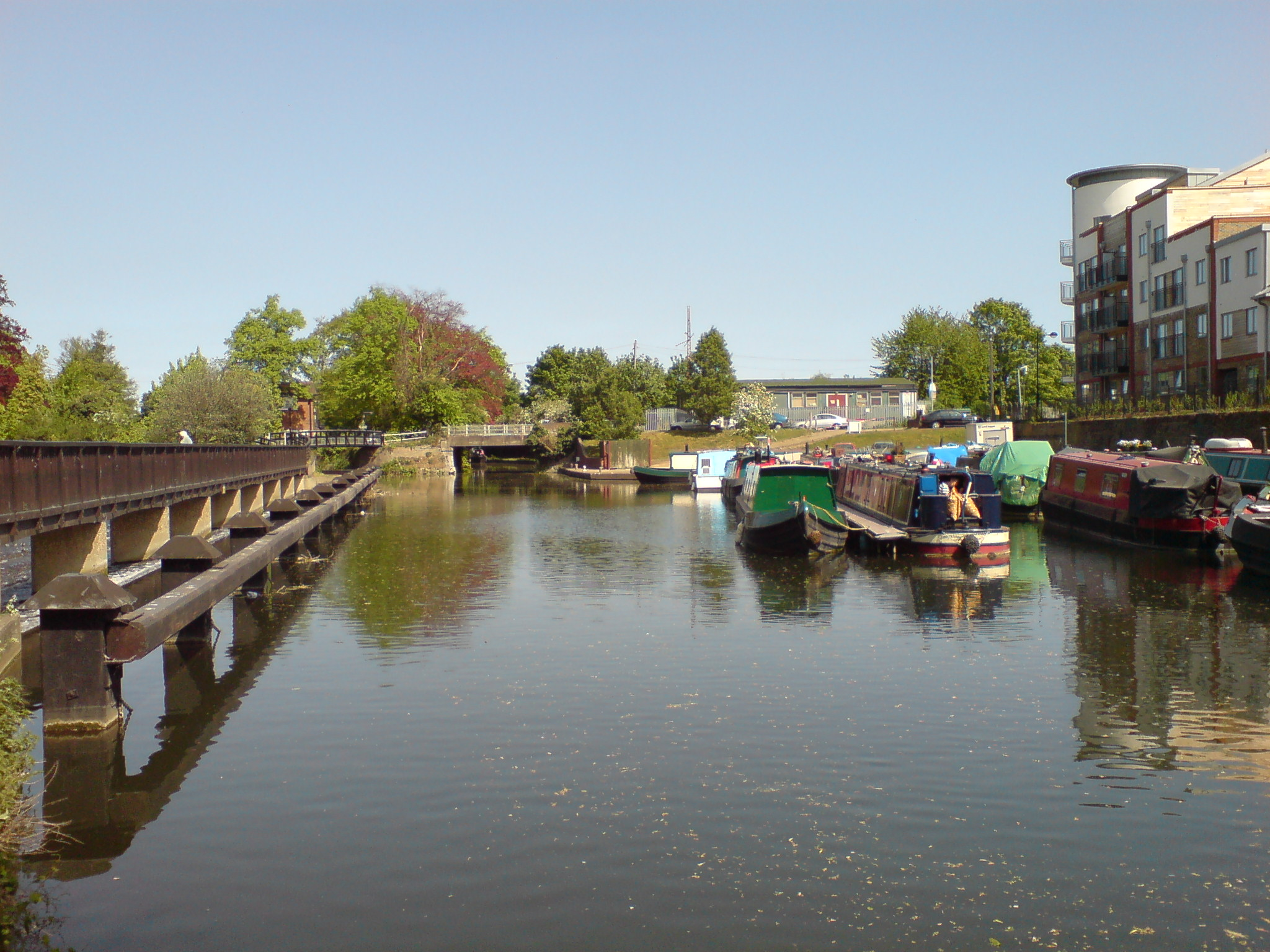
Hertford Basin

Hertford Basin is the first canal basin located on the River Lee Navigation in Hertford, England. It is situated next to Hartham Common, and Hertford Weir, and is about 650m from Hertford Lock. For planning purposes, East Hertfordshire District Council has identified Hertford Basin as an important open space which is "visually attractive".
