= Hartham Weir =

Small weir on the River Lea in England

Coordinates: 51.80309°N 0.07235°W

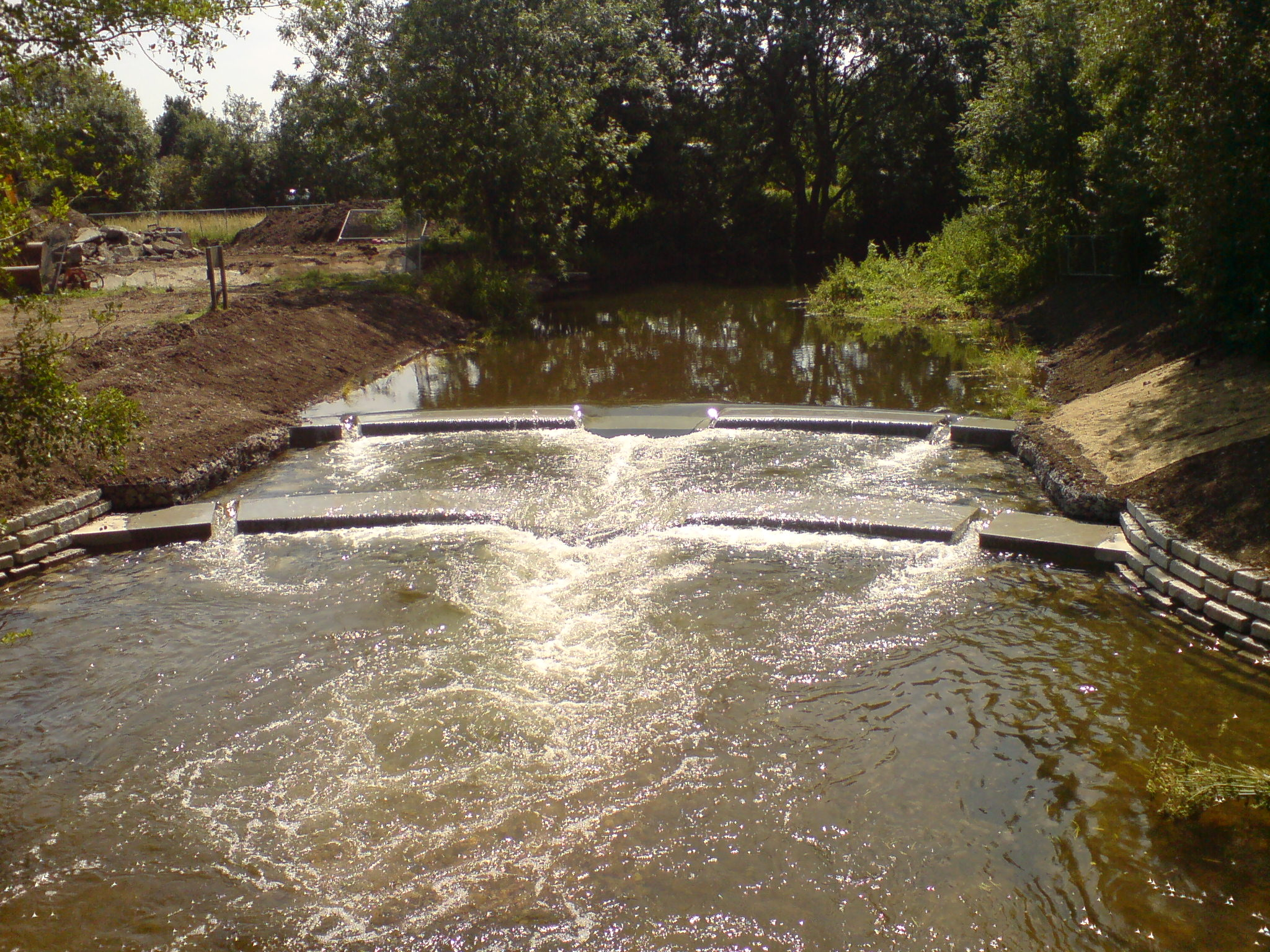
Hartham Weir shortly after rebuilding

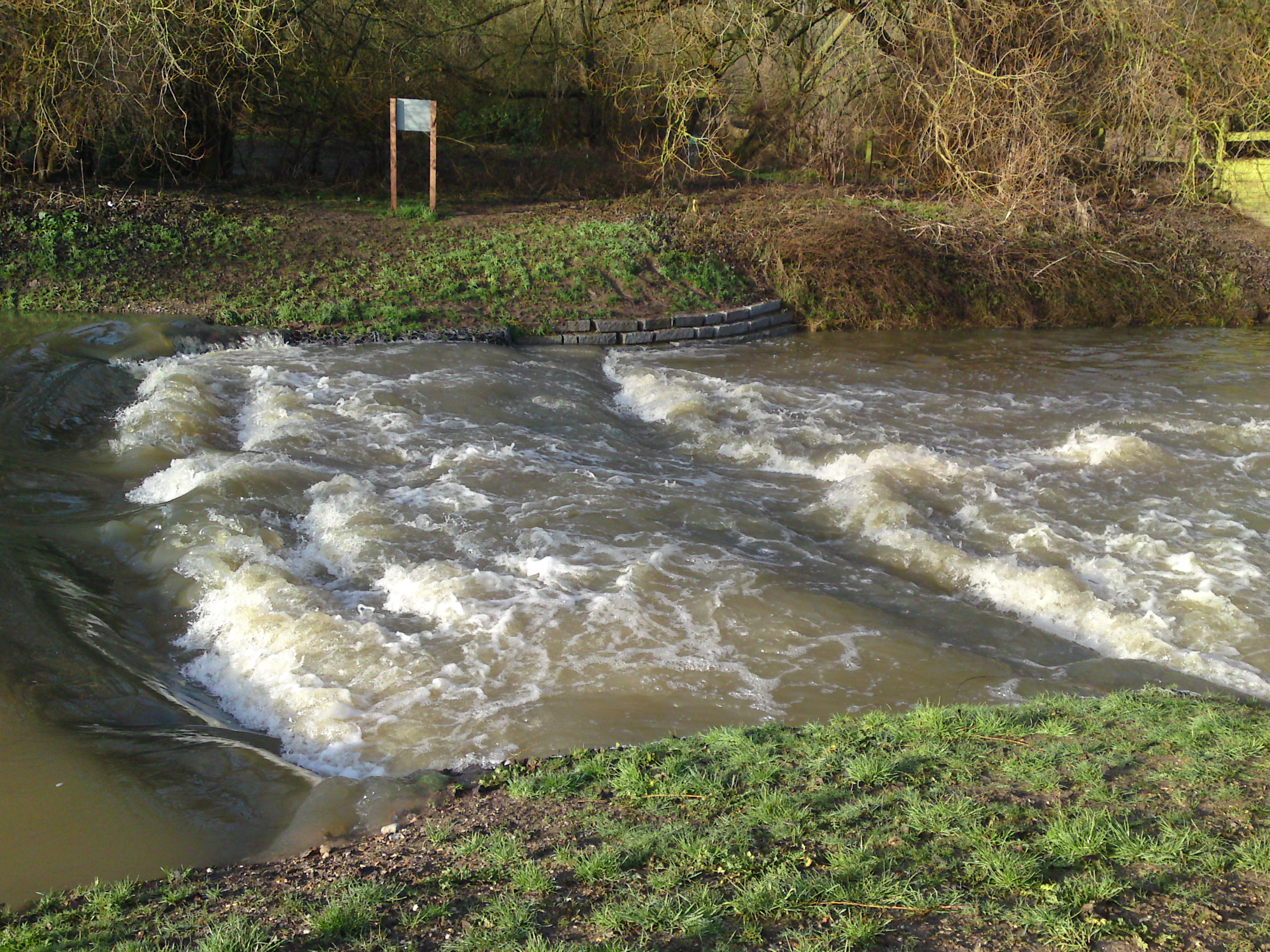
Hartham Weir after heavy rain

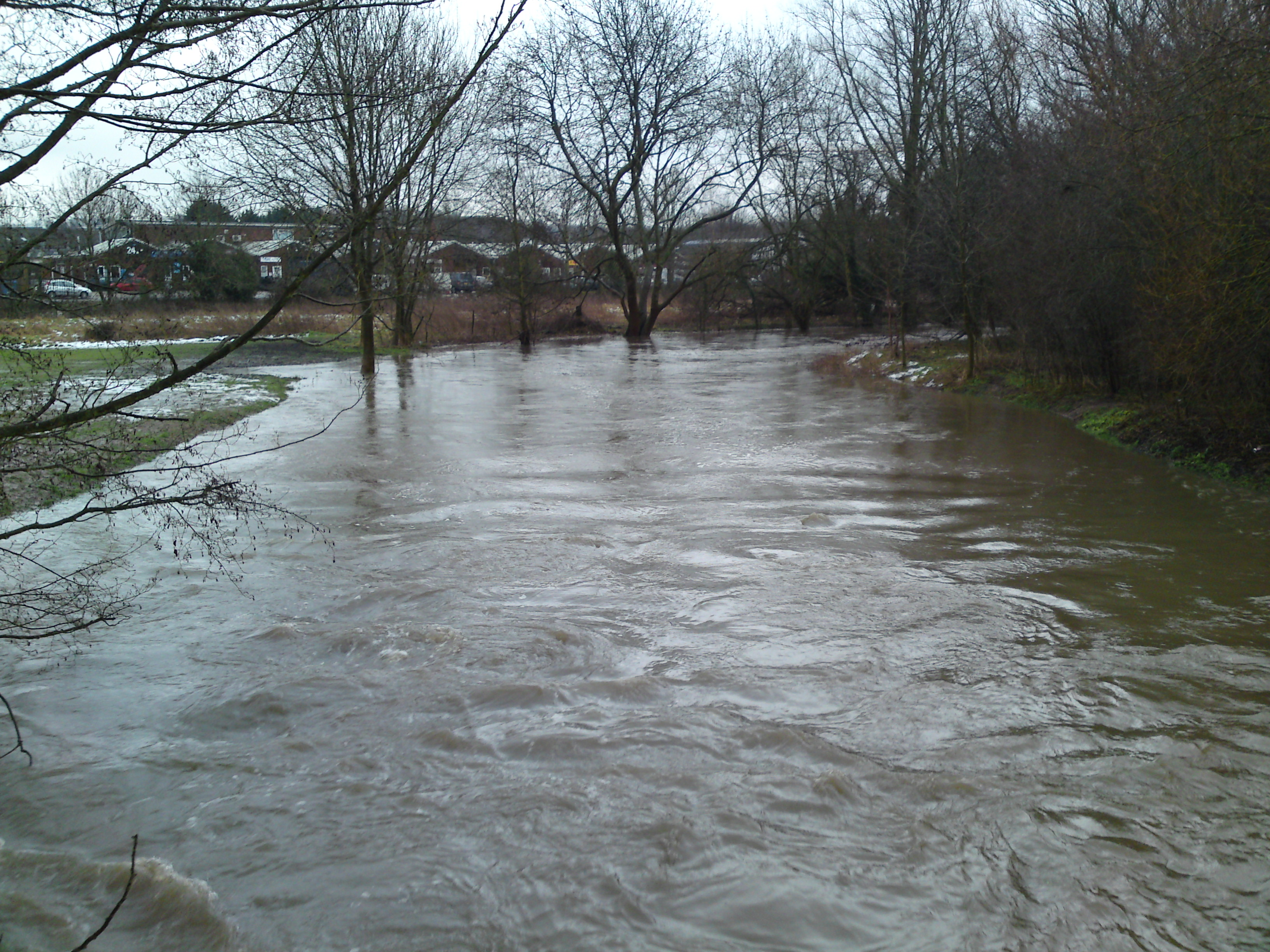
Hartham Weir during flood

Hartham Weir (also known colloquially as Two-step Weir) is a small weir on the River Lea next to the confluence of the River Beane/Lea, on the edge of Hartham Common, Hertford, England.

== Design ==
The weir was installed to let the river travel over a main sewer pipe.

== Uses ==
It is frequented by the Herts Canoe Club and local anglers.

== 2008 rebuild ==
The weir was demolished and rebuilt in 2008, costing £310,000.

Local MP Mark Prisk and Herts Canoe Club re-opened the weir in a ceremony on Saturday, 25 October 2008.

== Old Weir Gallery ==
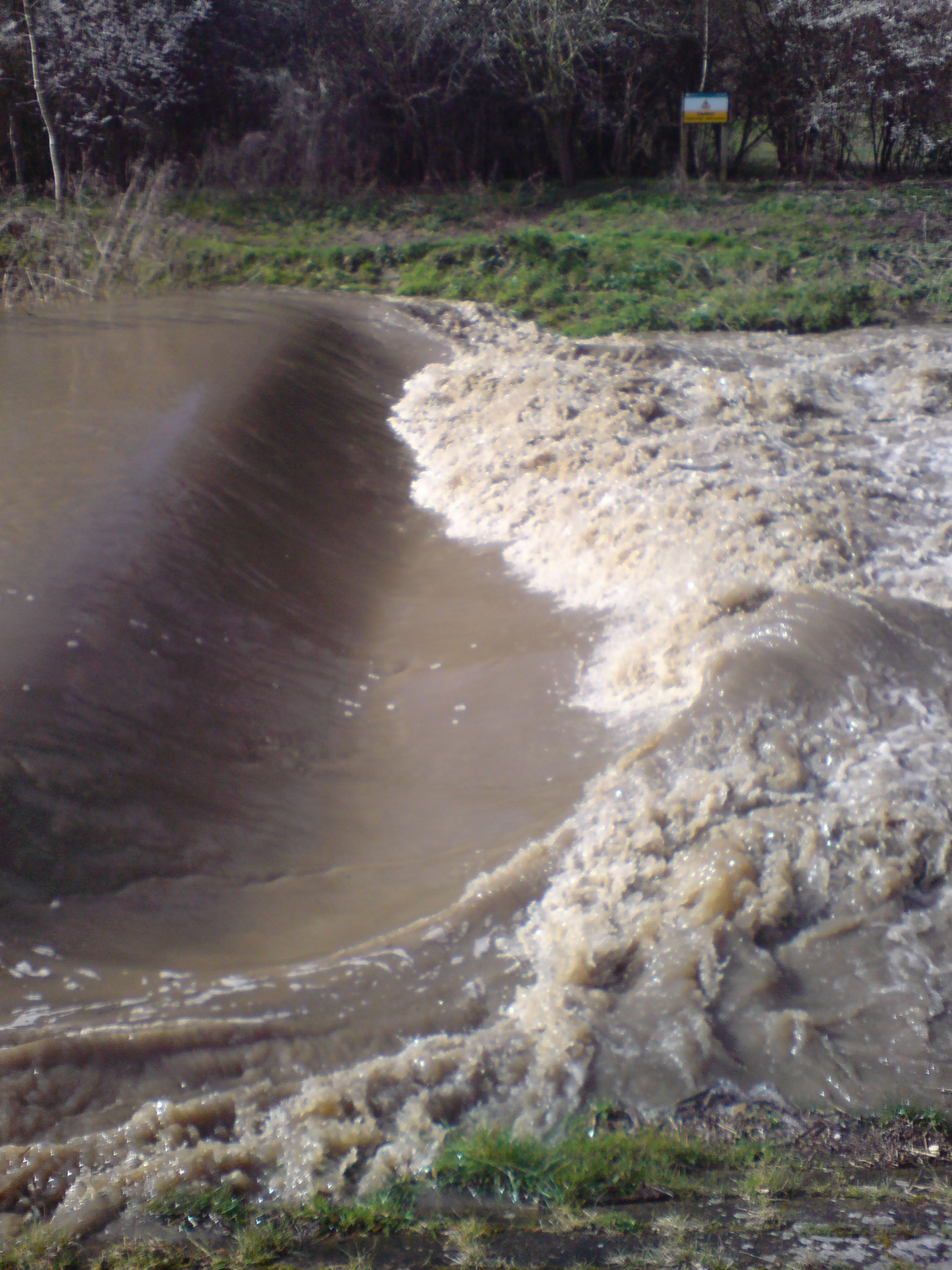
Old 2-step weir in flood

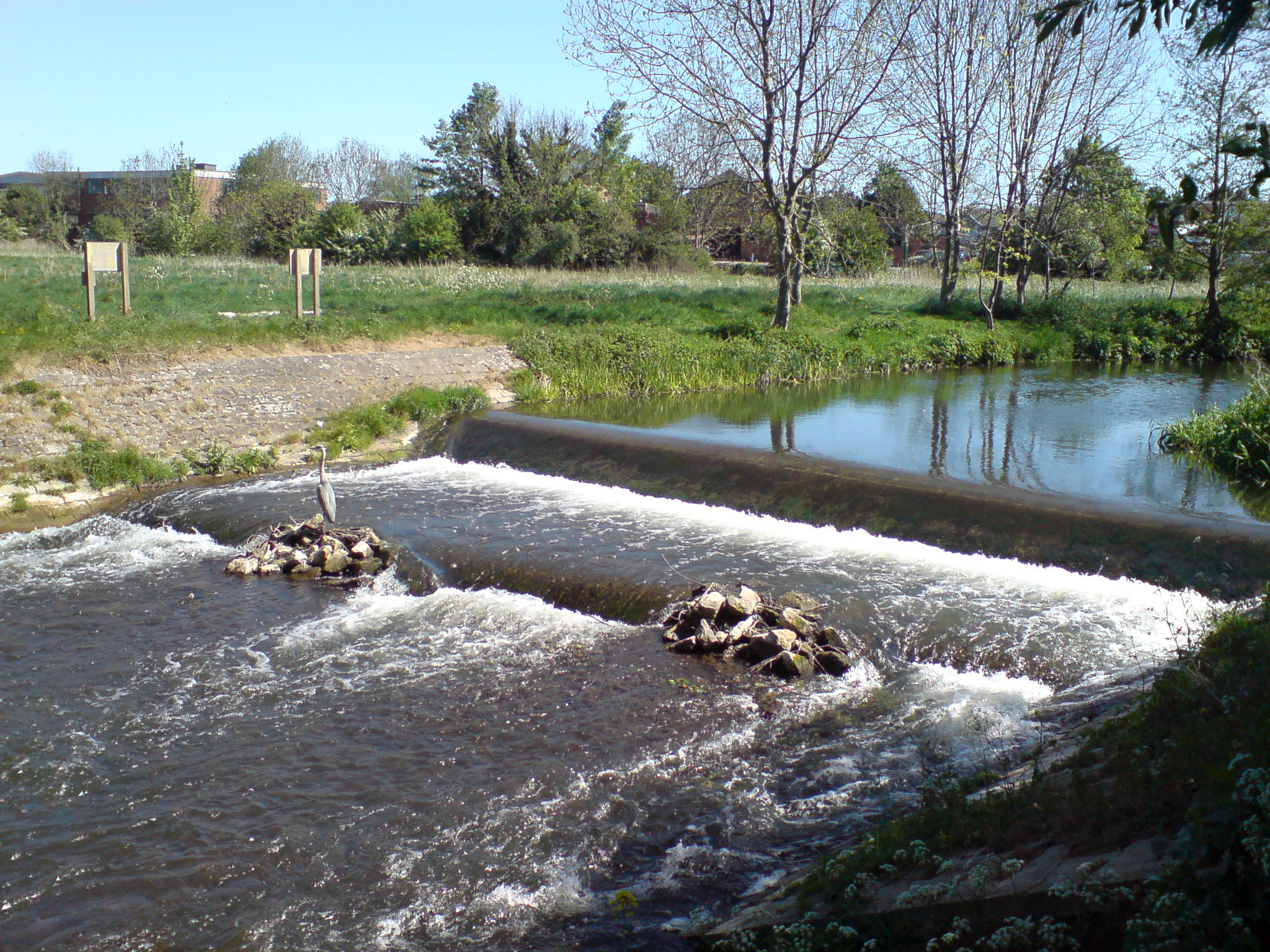
Old 2-step weir with local heron
