= Town centre =

Commercial or geographical centre or core area of a town

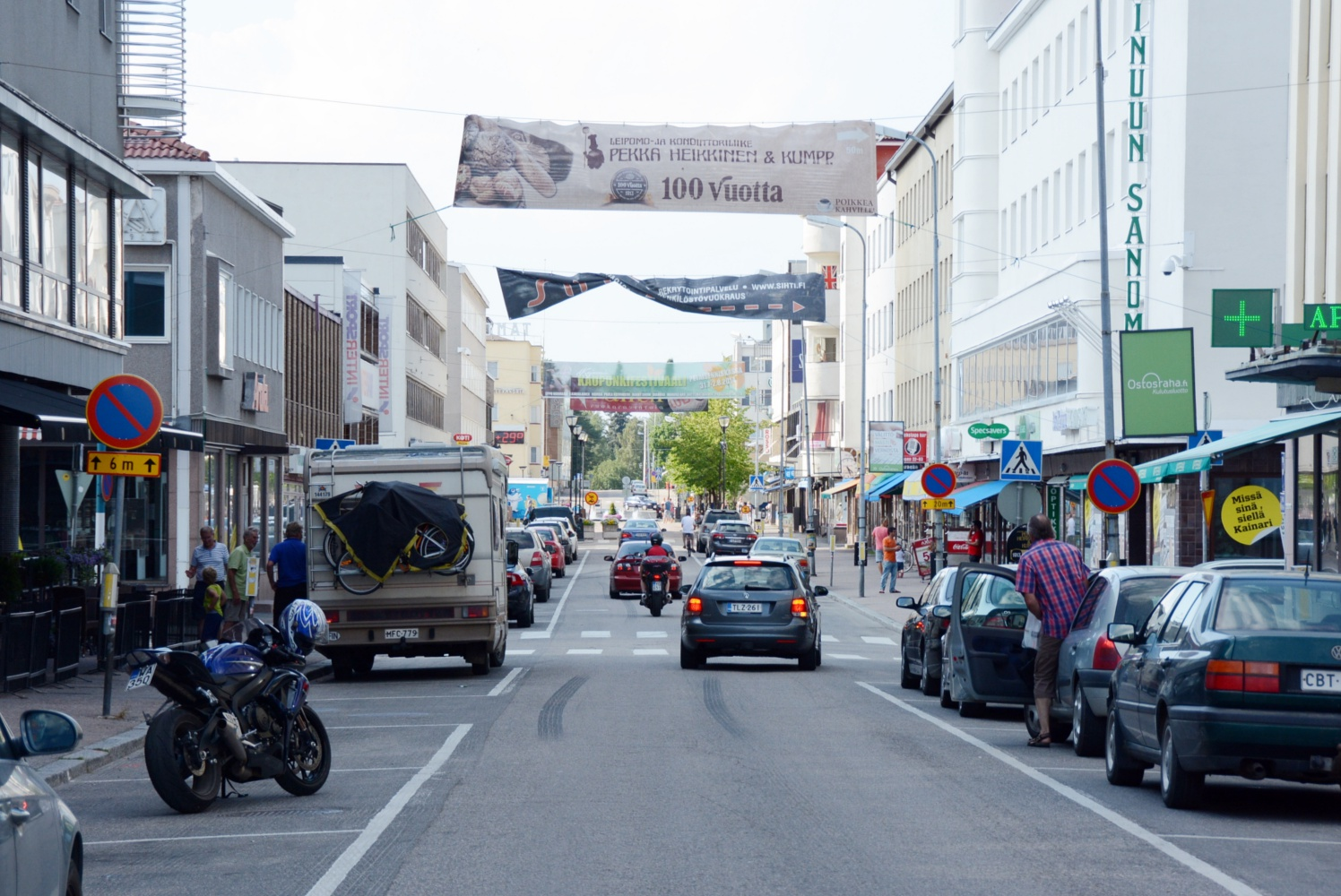
Town centre of Kajaani, Kainuu, Finland

A town centre is the commercial or geographical centre or core area of a town. Town centres are traditionally associated with shopping or retail. They are also the centre of communications with major public transport hubs such as train or bus stations. Public buildings including town halls, museums and libraries are often found in town centres.

Town centres are symbolic to settlements as a whole and often contain the best examples of architecture, main landmark buildings, statues and public spaces associated with a place.

== Canada ==
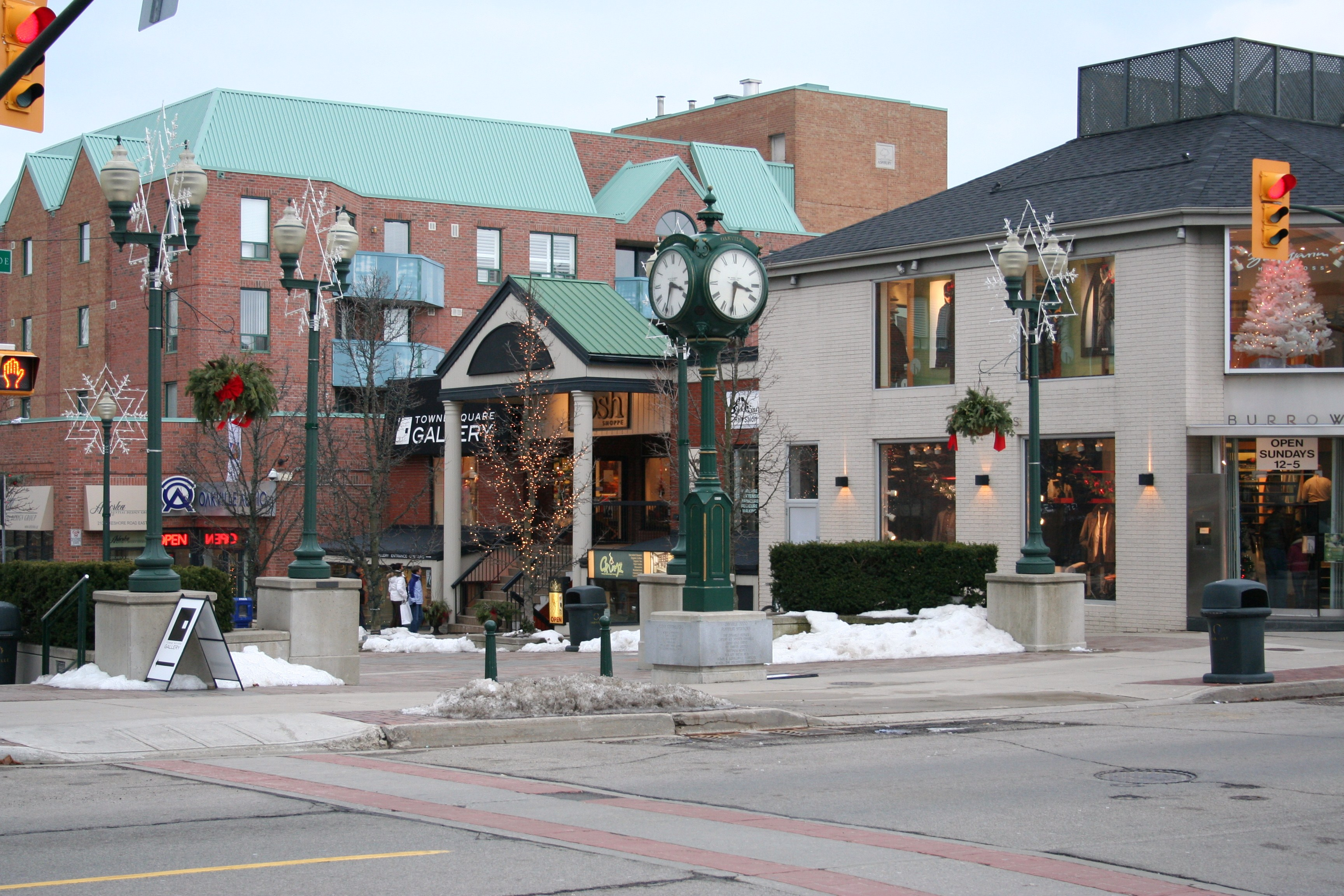
Town centre of Oakville, Ontario, Canada.

In some areas of Canada, particularly large, urban areas, town centres refer to alternate commercial areas to the city's downtown. These centres are usually located within a large neighbourhood and characterized by medium-high density commercial and residential property; such as Brentwood and Lougheed Town Centres in Burnaby.

== Philippines ==
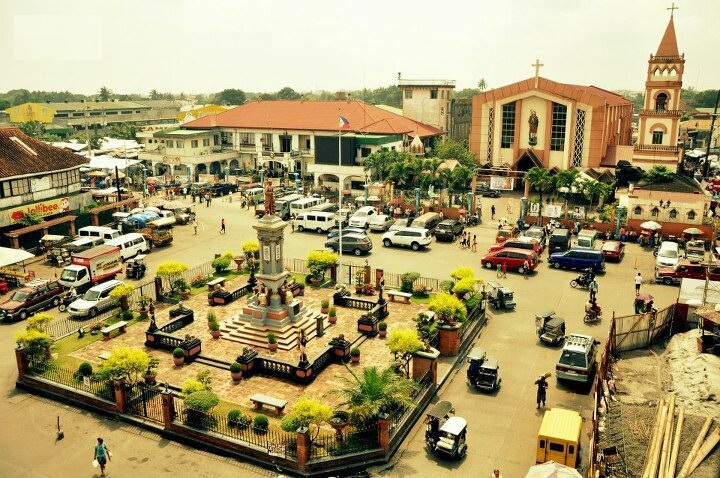
Plaza Rizal in Biñan's poblacion

Poblacion (from Spanish población, meaning "population"), sometimes abbreviated as Pob., is a term used in the Philippines to refer to the administrative center, downtown, old town, or commercial area of a city or municipality. It may consist of a single barangay or multiple barangays. Colloquially, the poblacion area is also referred to as the bayan (see also other definitions of bayan), plaza, or centro.

== United Kingdom ==
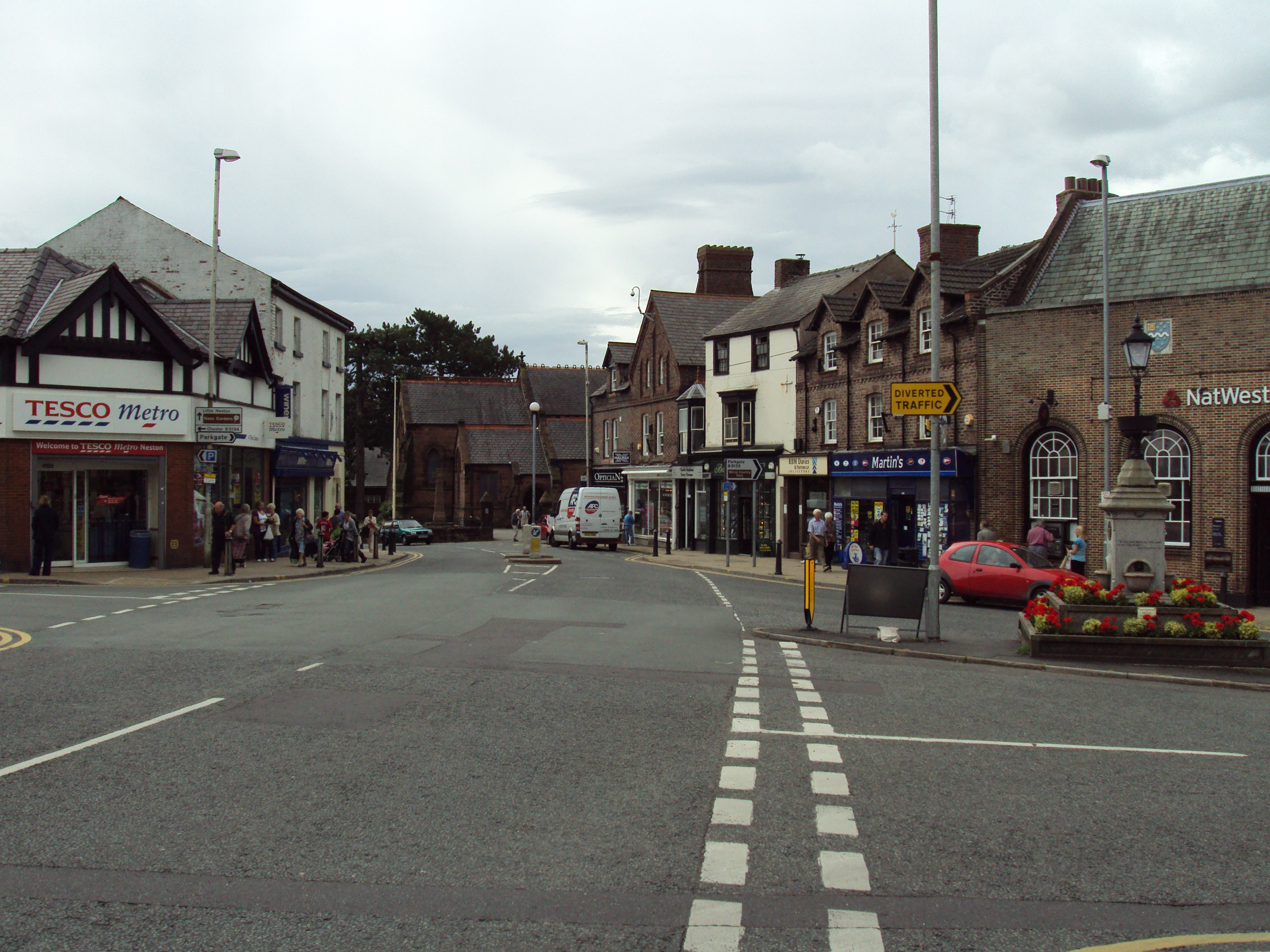
Town centre of Neston, Cheshire, England.

The first example in the UK of a purposely planned commercial or town centre is Newcastle's Grainger Town in the 1840s.

As changes in shopping patterns occurred, town centres have been forced to adapt and meet those changes. Comprehensive redevelopment of many British town centres occurred in the 1960s and 1970s, which often resulted in development of larger store formats, often with modernist styles of architecture significantly different from their surroundings.

Other major changes included the development of indoor shopping malls in major towns and cities. Examples include the Manchester Arndale Centre, the St. James Centre in Edinburgh and the Bullring Centre in Birmingham. They tended to be constructed in a Brutalist or Modernist fashion reflecting the architectural styles of the period.

During the Thatcher government of the 1980s, a change in planning policy allowed competing out-of-town shopping and leisure centres to be developed. Examples include the Metro Centre in Gateshead, the Merry Hill Shopping Centre in Dudley, and the Gyle Centre in Edinburgh. Developments of this type have, in a number of places, resulted in a decline in traditional town centres.

The preponderance of chain stores using the same corporate identity, livery and so on in most or all of their outlets has led to a lack of diversity in many towns and cities, with the phrase clone town being used.

Today, there is a focus on the redevelopment of town centres and the creation of a greater mix of uses in the centres. Planning policy focus aims to maintain town centres as vibrant successful places, which are accessible to everyone by means other than the private car.

Many town centres have undergone major redevelopment, with environmental improvements and increased retail floorspace. Major town centre shopping malls, such as the Arndale Centre and the Bullring Centre, have also undergone major redevelopment to improve their image.

== See also ==
- Downtown
- City centre
- Central business district
