= Hartham Common =

Park in Hertford, Hertfordshire, England

Coordinates: 51°48′04″N 0°04′36″W

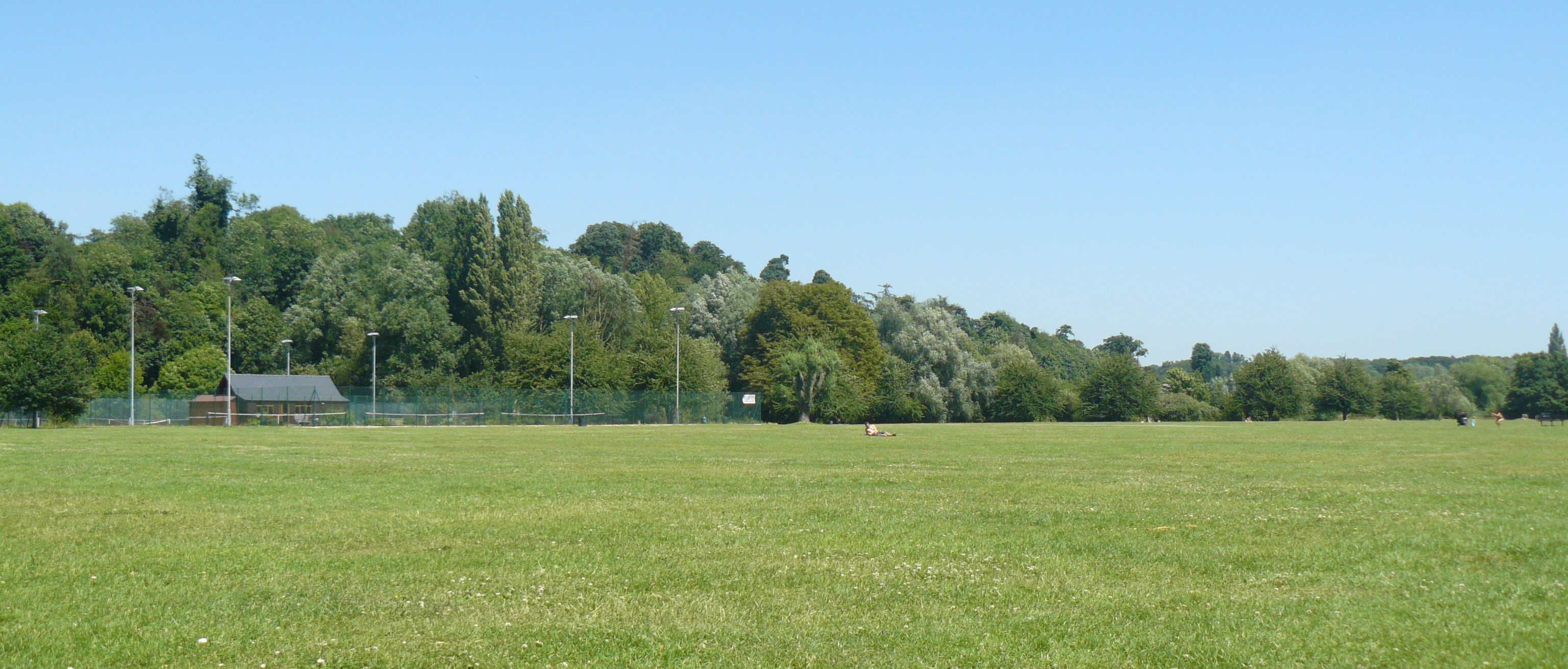
Hartham Common

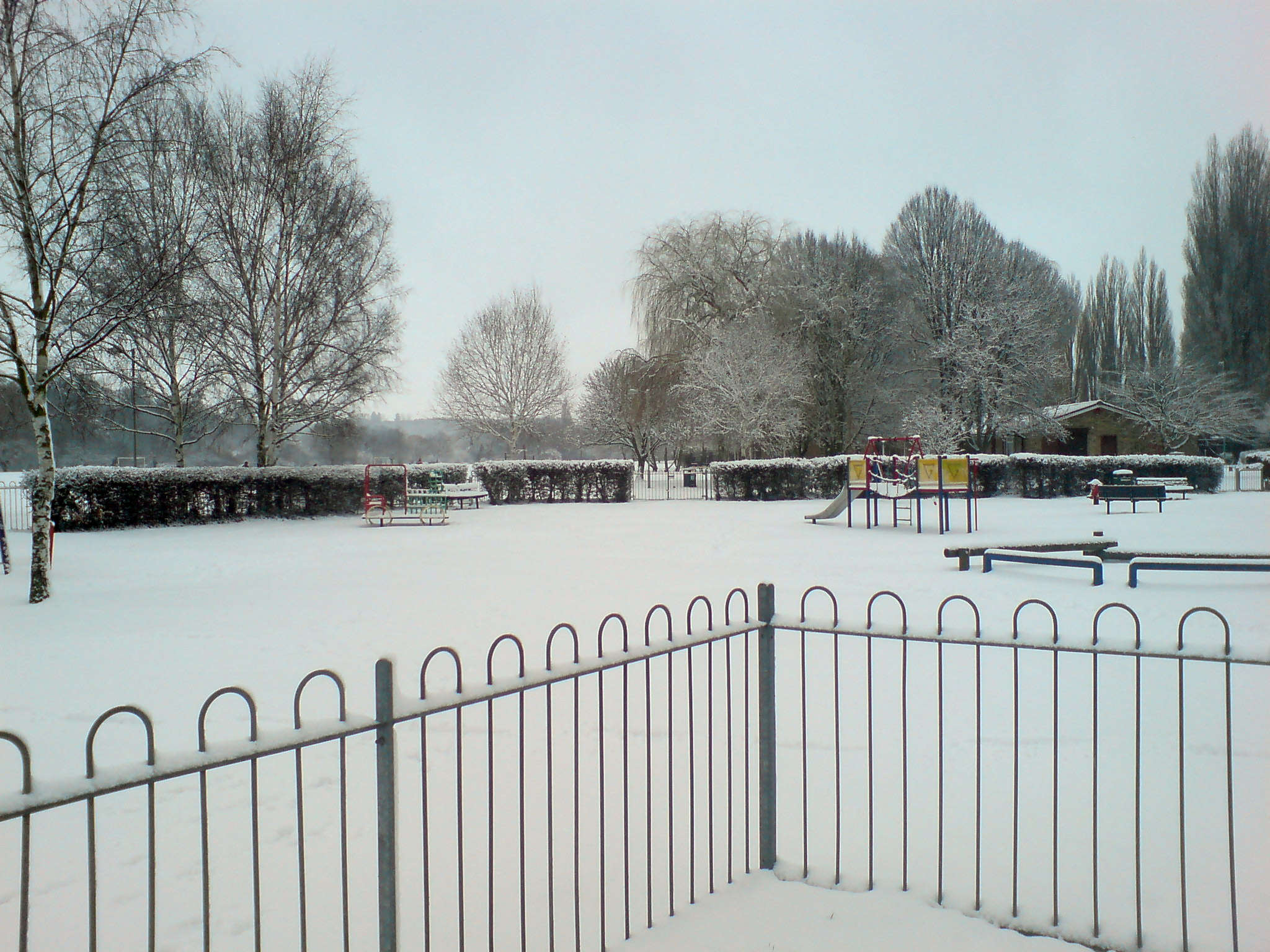
Playground in the snow.

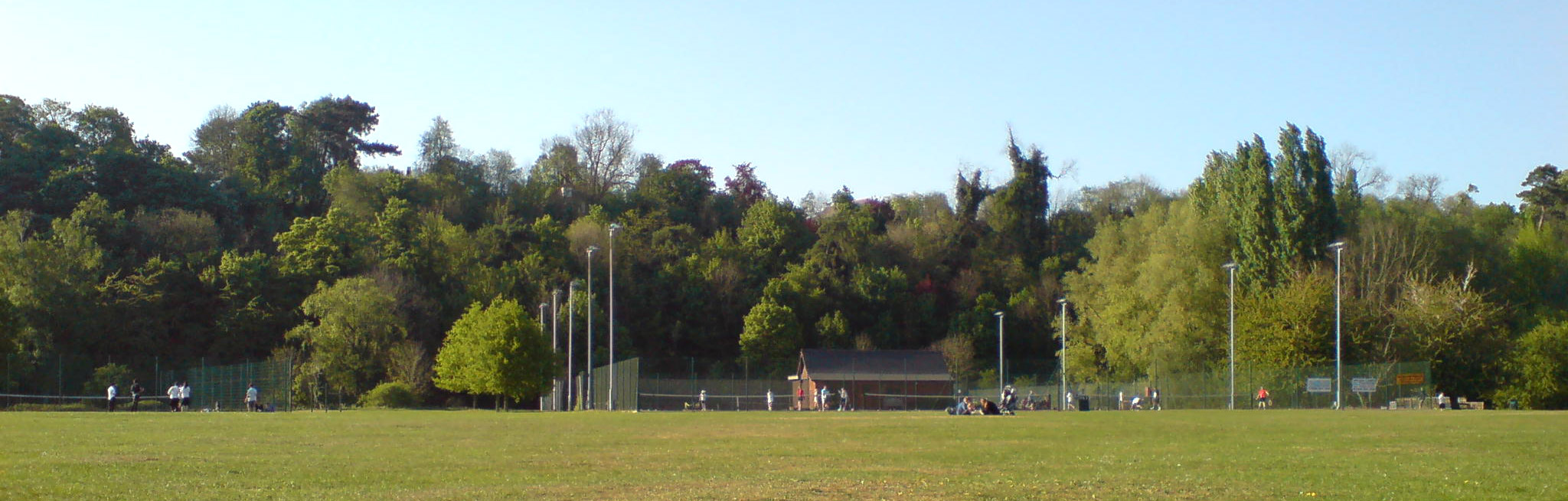
Hertford Lawn Tennis Club.

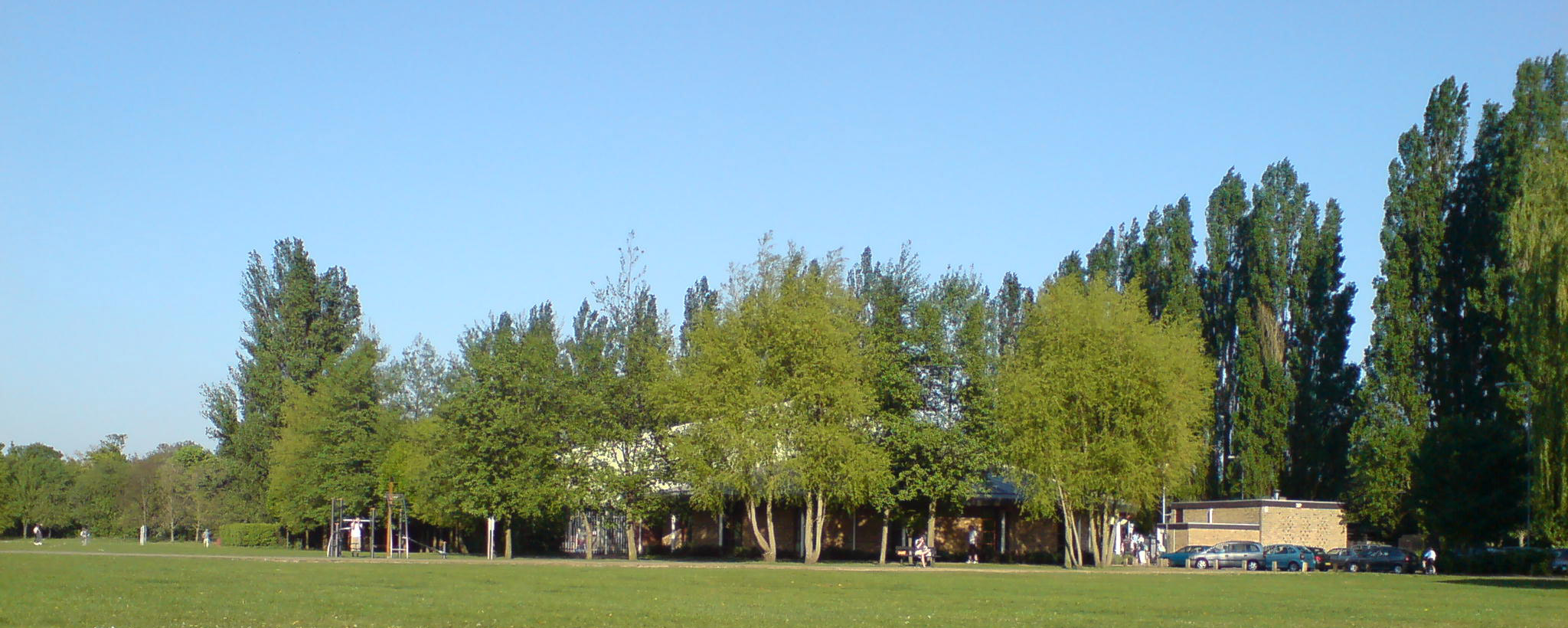
Hartham pool and gym.

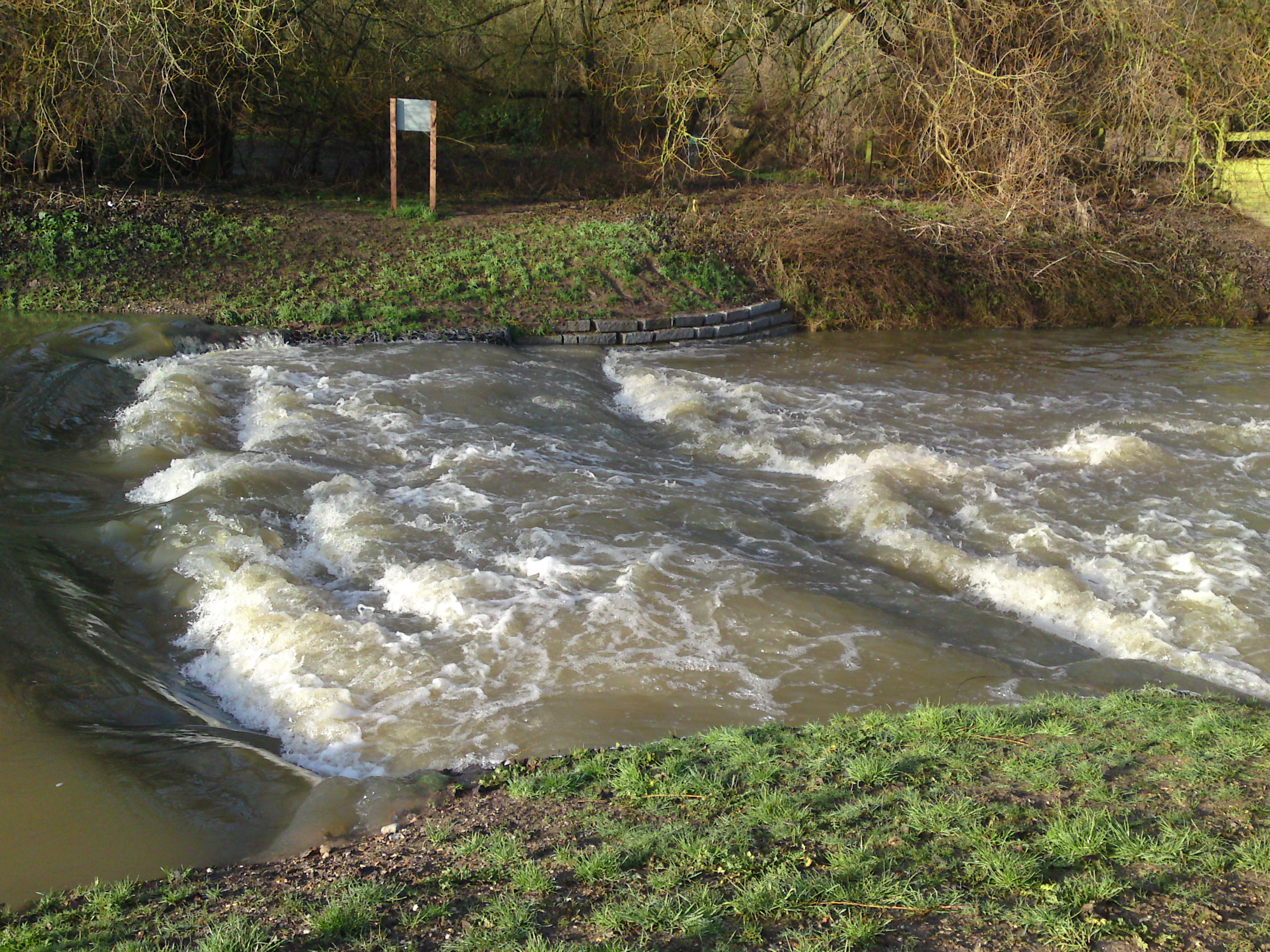
Hartham Weir

Hartham Common is a park in the county of Hertfordshire in the East of England. It is located between the town centre of the county town of Hertford and the elevated suburb of Bengeo.

== Location ==
The park is situated in the valley of the River Lea and the River Beane, where the rivers' confluence is, at the eastern edge of the main field. The River Rib enters further east of the main field.

== Facilities ==
Hartham Common is very sports-orientated, with many different sports being practiced in the area. A selection includes football, rugby, tennis, fishing, bowls, kayaking and canoeing. A full gym and swimming pool is located on the edge of the park next to Kallum Weir.

A large fenced children's play area provides a place for parents to take their young children, and an adjacent skatepark is available as well as a separate designated play area for older children.

== Clubs and organisations ==
Organisations with physical presence on the common include:

- Hartham Pool and Gym
- Hertford Lawn Tennis Club
- Herts Canoe Club
- Sele Farm Bowls Club
- Hertford Basin – a marina for narrowboats.
