= Louis Marchesi =

British philanthropist (1898–1968)

Erminio William Louis Marchesi (19 January 1898 – 10 December 1968) founded the Round Table, an international fellowship and community charitable organisation for young men.

His mother was born in England to Irish parents and his father was Swiss from Poschiavo. Marchesi was a young member of the Rotary Club in Norwich when he listened to the radio and heard the then Prince of Wales challenge the young men of Britain to "sit round a table (Round Table) adopt an idea, adapt it and improve it" (the motto is Adopt, Adapt, Improve). He conceived a club which could support younger businessmen; an idea he suggested to the membership in 1926. The first Round Table - "Norwich Round Table No. 1" was formed at Suckling House, Norwich on 14 March 1927, with Marchesi as Secretary and other young Rotarians among its officers. To prevent 'Round Table' becoming an old persons' club the founders initiated a retirement age of 31 March following the 40th birthday. He served in the forces in both the First and Second World Wars. He was married with one son Peter.

The following phrases are attributed to him:

1. "There are things we must do"
2. "There are things we can do"
3. "And there are things we should do"

Marchesi died at his residence in Norwich on 10 December 1968, and is buried in Earlham Road Cemetery, Norwich. A memorial service was held in Westminster Cathedral the following year.

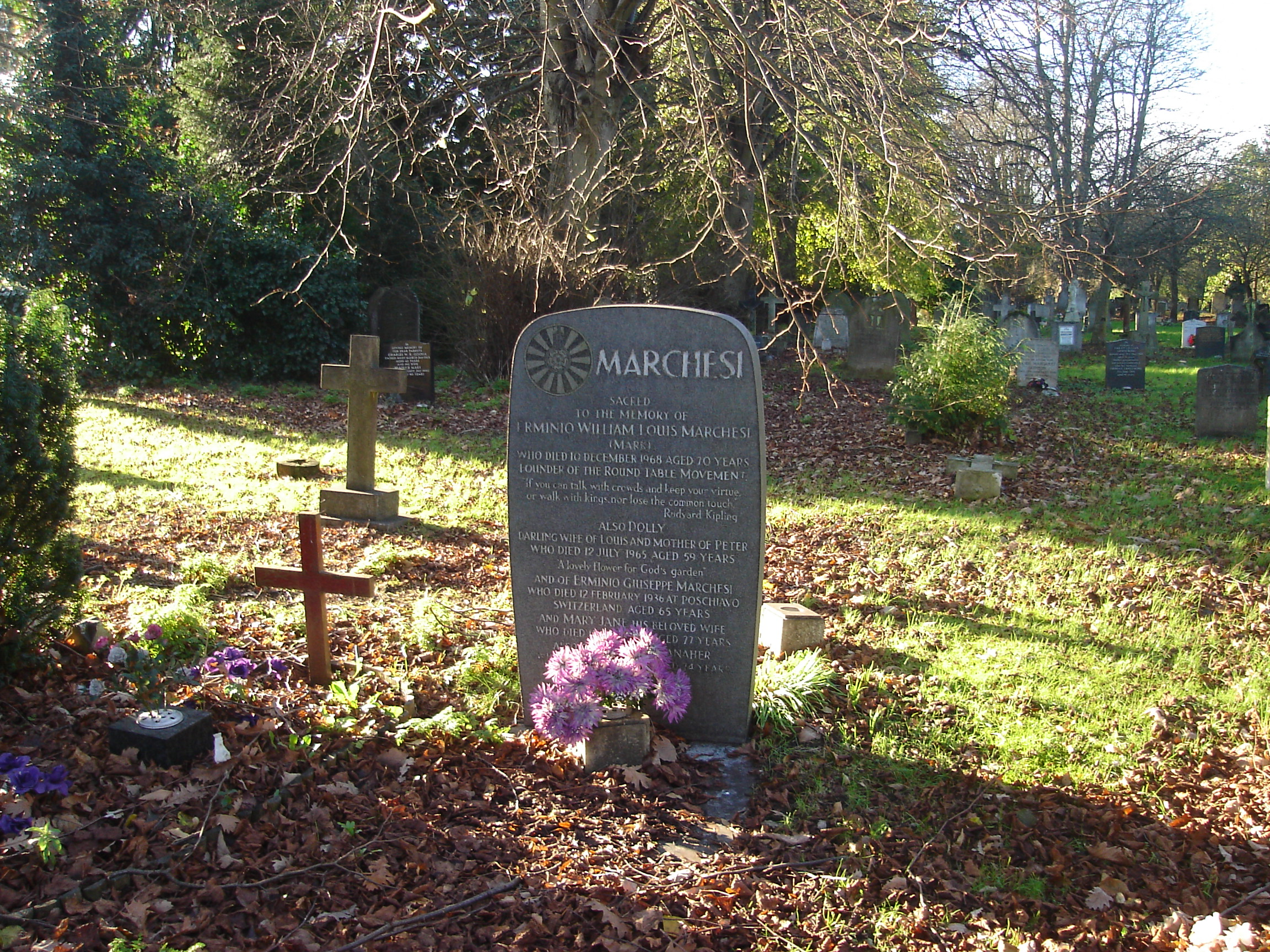
Marchesi's grave in Norwich

A public house in the city's Tombland area, previously called The Waggon and Horses, was renamed The Louis Marchesi in 1976. The pub closed in 2005 and was later re-opened as a café bar. In August 2017, the pub reopened once again under the name The Louis Marchesi.

A Masonic Lodge in Uffculme in Devon, The Louis Marchesi Lodge, is named after him.
