= Round Table (club) =

International social organisation

Round Table International
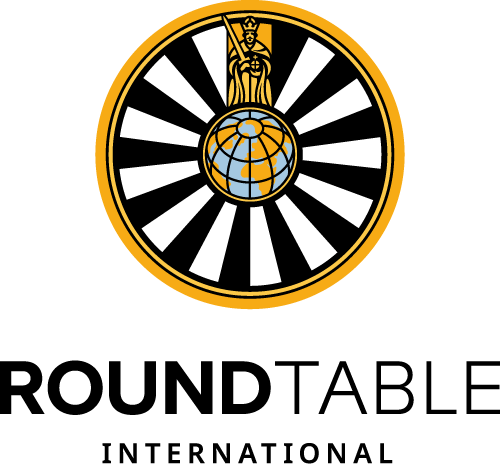
- Formation: 1927; 99 years ago
- Founder: Louis Marchesi
- Founded at: Norwich, Norfolk, England
- Headquarters: Luxembourg
- Members: 30,000
- President: Christopher Mintoff (2025/2026)
- Website: www.round-table.org

Round Table International is an international non-political and non-religious organisation for young men founded in Norwich, England, in 1927 by Louis Marchesi. The members in the organisation are of community leaders, professionals and driven individuals. Initially, the organisation was founded for young men in England. As of 2024, the organisation has 30,000 active members from over 65 countries, who are known as Tablers.

== Description ==
The motto of Round Table is: "Adopt. Adapt. Improve."

The organisation was founded in Norwich, England, in 1927 by Erminio William Louis Marchesi (°19/01/1898 – 10/12/1968) after which it spread forming a total of 99 national associations (some of which are no longer active).

The national associations are in turn members of Round Table International. Round Table International is governed by the Round Table International board, which is elected annually from its members’ members, i.e. Tablers of the national associations. The Round Table International board establish policies and make recommendations as to the overall direction of the Round Table movement.

== History ==
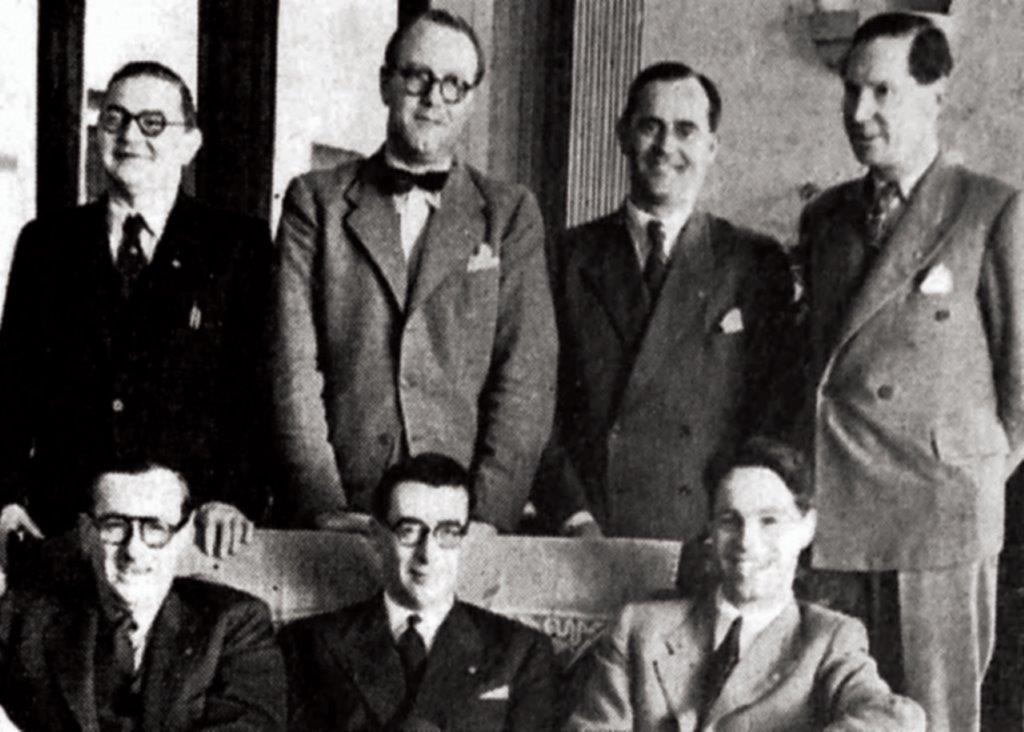
First Round Table International Meeting at Hastings in 1948

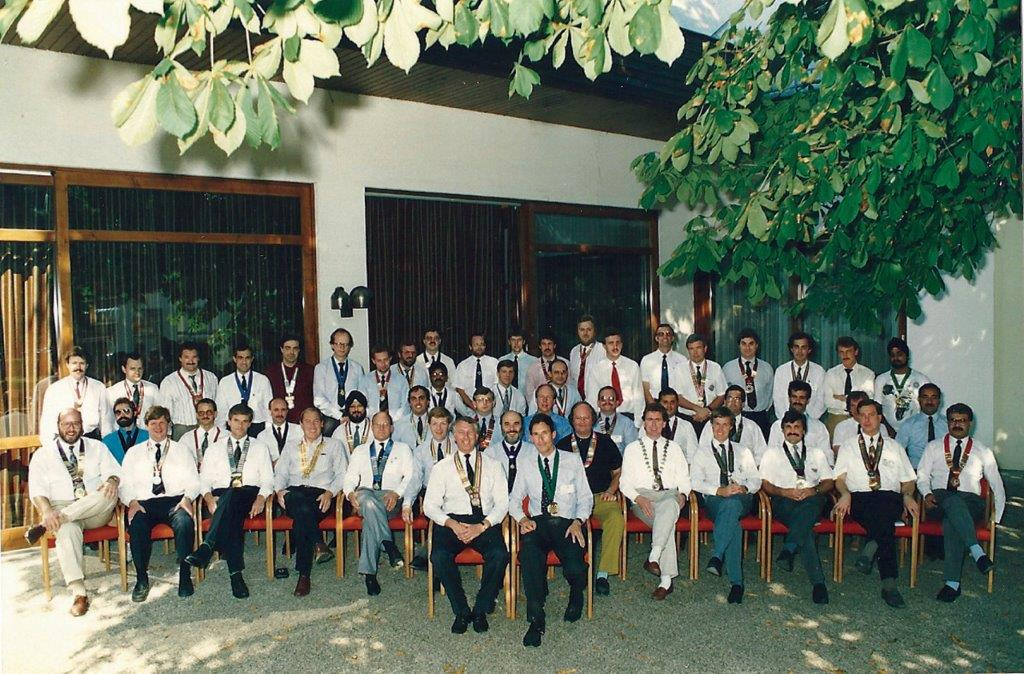
Round Table International Re-Charter in 1991

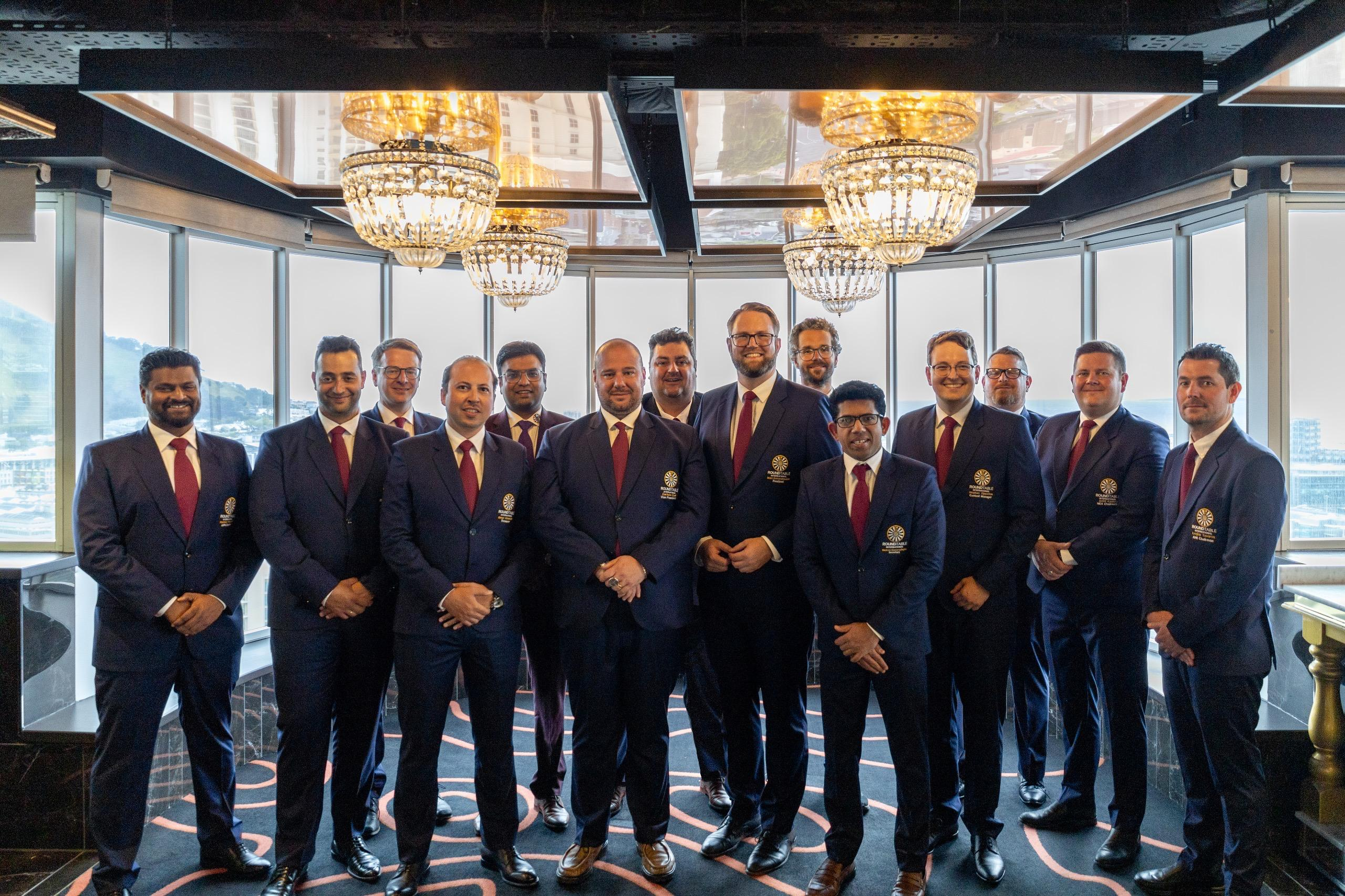
Round Table International Board 2023/2024

The first Round Table was established in Norwich, England in 1927 by Louis Marchesi, a young member of the Norwich Rotary Club. Marchesi envisioned a gathering place for young businessmen where they exchange ideas, learn from each other's experiences, and contribute collectively to the civic life of Norwich. In a speech before Rotarians, Marchesi articulated the ethos of the Round Table, emphasising the importance of action and the role of young people in effecting change. He proposed a forum where members could engage in meaningful dialogue and participate actively in their community.

Within a year of its inception, the Norwich Round Table's membership grew to 85, sparking interest in establishing similar organisations elsewhere. Emphasizing its non-religious and non-political nature, Round Table quickly expanded, establishing a second chapter in Portsmouth. By the outbreak of World War II in 1939, there were 125 Tables and a membership of 4,600, demonstrating the organisation's rapid growth and international appeal.

The internationalisation of Round Table became evident with the formation of the first overseas Table in Copenhagen in 1936. Despite wartime constraints, Round Table continued to expand, particularly in Denmark, while activity in the British Isles was limited.

Post-war, Round Table experienced a resurgence, with new chapters chartered across the UK and beyond. By January 1947, discussions began among existing Round Table associations about closer cooperation and international fellowship. This culminated in establishing Round Table International (RTI) at the first general meeting held in Hastings in May 1948, alongside the RTBI National conference. By 1961, Round Table had a presence in over 30 countries.

In a decision at the 1961 RTI meeting in Salzburg, Round Table International became a part of the World Council of Service Clubs (WOCO), aligning all Round Table associations under WOCO's aims and objectives. In 1991, various Round Table associations opted to reform RTI as a standalone entity, leading to its restructuring and independence.

Since 1991, Round Table established as a global organisation in over 70 countries, that fosters fellowship, community service, and personal development among young men.

== Logo ==
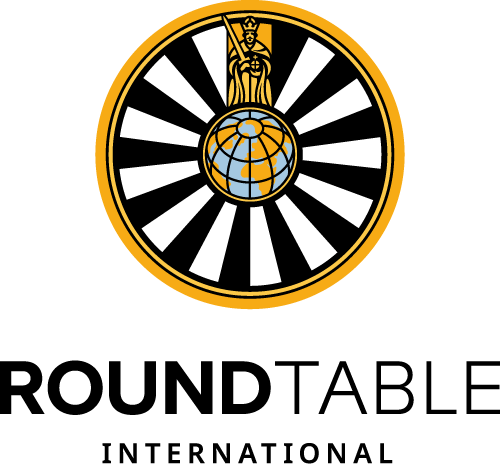
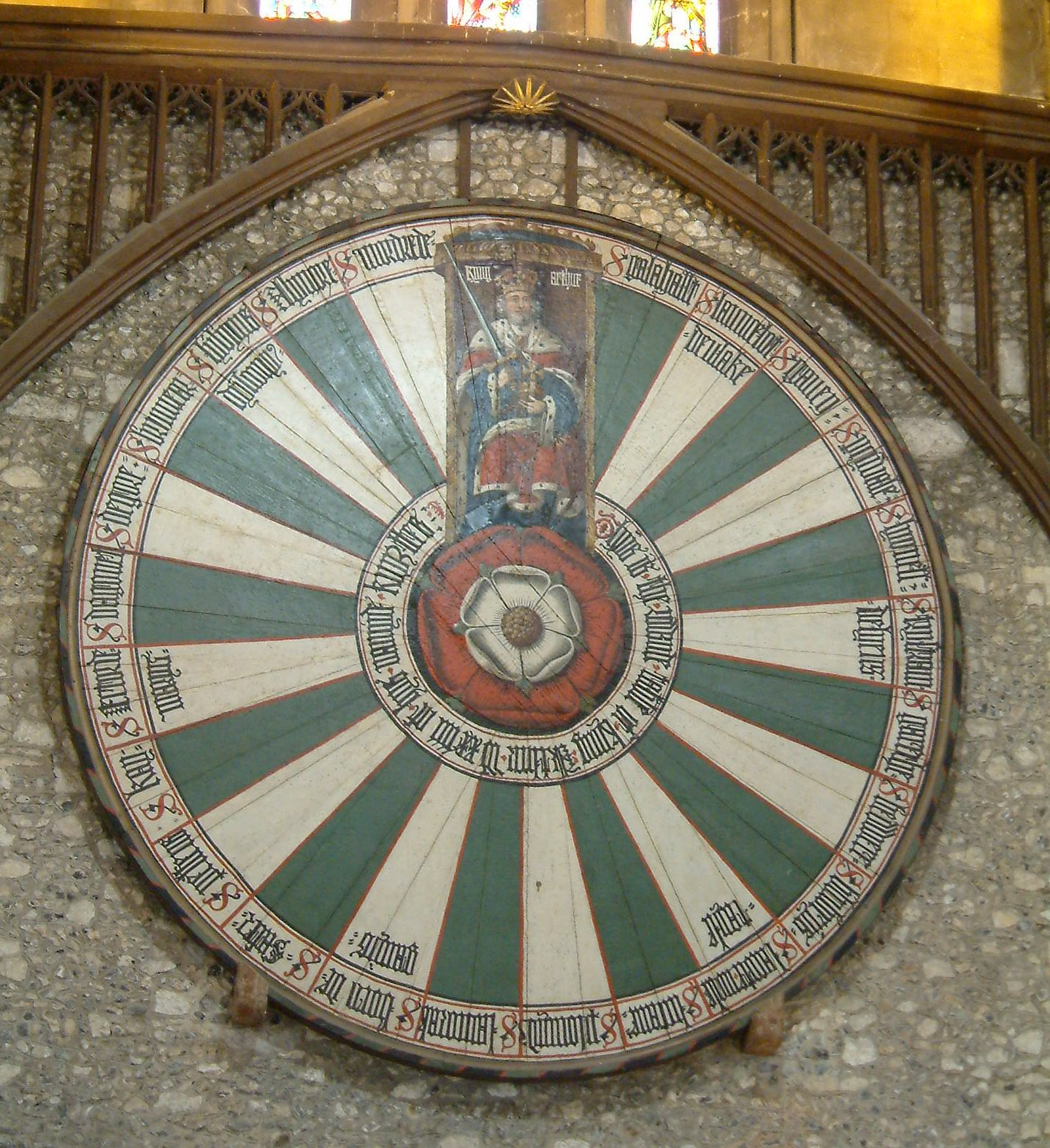

The Great Hall in the Winchester Castle in Hampshire, England, houses one of the most important symbols of medieval mythology and inspiration to the organisation's emblem, King Arthur’s Round Table. Although Round Table International has no direct affiliation with the Knights of the Round Table, its logos are inspired by the Arthurian legend. With no head at the table, the iconic top personifies chivalry, service, equality and shared importance. The table in The Great Hall is not from the time of King Arthur but rather built six centuries later by Edward I, according to radiocarbon dating and carpentry studies. It was likely used as the centrepiece at a tournament in 1290 to celebrate the engagement of one of Edward's daughters. It was later restored & painted by Henry VIII, & features 24 Arthurian knights' names around the perimeter. Constructed of English oak, the centre piece measures 5.5 meters in diameter, weighs 1.32 tons, and once had 12 outer legs and a central support.

Inspired by the above, the Round Table International logo, also referred to as a "Rondel", features a globe in the centre and around it, black and white stripes which form a circle. And on top, the King. The current logo and other national logos were modernized in 2022. The image or icon depicted in the centre of most National Rondels differentiates as it represents a national symbol, for example, a national animal or flora. The First Round Table, Great Britain & Ireland, features the Tudor Rose. In some instances of national representation, the king's appearance is different or replaced by a national relevant substitute. Often, on the outside of the rondel, the country's colours are prominent.

== Organisation and structure ==
Round Table is a club for young men aged between 18 and 45 in the founders country (or 40 in some countries) regardless of their religious beliefs or political affiliations. Membership is by invitation and extended by current members who subsequently act as sponsors for new members. Round Table sees himself not solely as a business-oriented club, more as a platform for networking, idea exchange, and fostering fellowship. The organisation actively seeks professionals from diverse backgrounds to enrich the Club's membership.
