= Chapel Field Christian Schools =

Coordinates: 41°36′9″N 74°14′43″W

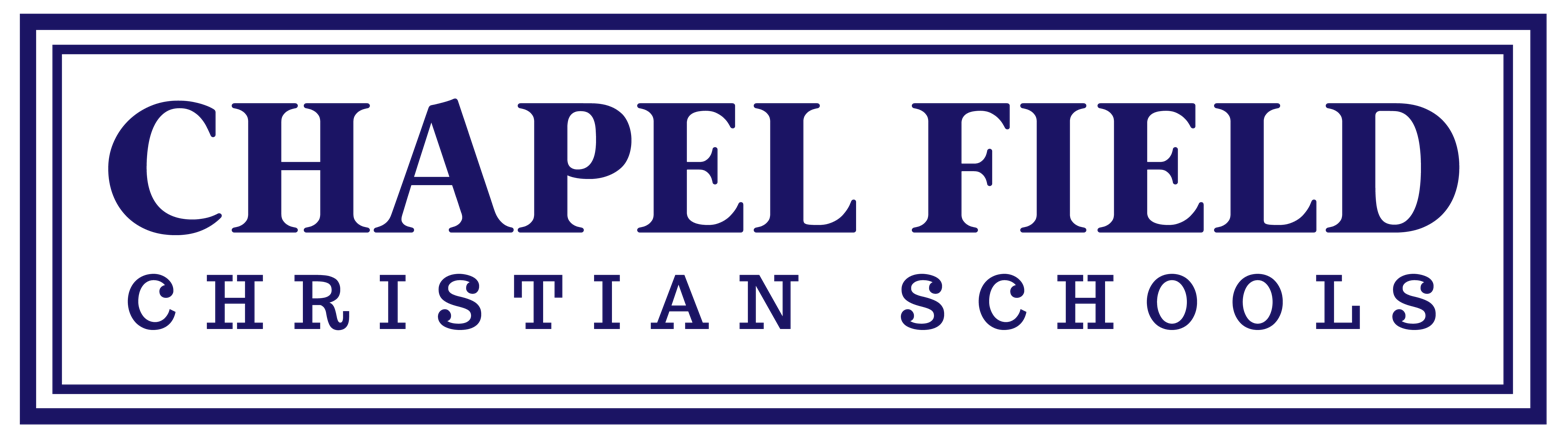

Location
- 211 Fleury Road; Pine Bush, New York 12566

Information
- Type: Private Christian School
- Established: 1986
- Grades: Pre K - 12
- Enrollment: ≈ 300
- Campus size: 100 acres
- Colors: Blue and Gold
- Mascot: Lion
- Website: chapelfield.org

Chapel Field Christian Schools is a Pre K – 12 Christian school located in Pine Bush, New York. The school was founded in 1986 by William and Kathleen Spanjer.

== History ==
In 1979, William and Kathleen Spanjer founded Affirmative Evangelism Fellowship, a ministry devoted to Christian outreach. The ministry developed into a Christian high school in 1986. Despite its humble beginnings, the school's reputation began to grow as did its numbers. In the early 2000s Chapel Field began developing a middle school program and in 2005 plans began for an elementary school building. In 2007, Chapel Field Elementary School began its first full school year. In 2013, the school rolled out its first official Pre K program, making it a Pre K through 12th grade school.

In the late 2000s the school established its international program. As of 2019, students from over 15 countries across 5 continents have attended the school. Chapel Field expanded its international initiative to include a boarding program in 2016. The boarding program is also available to domestic students.

Chapel Field is accredited by the National Association of Private Schools, and incorporated under the University of the State of New York. Chapel Field is a member of several athletic leagues and music associations.

Chapel Field Schools has been consistently ranked as one of the "50 Best Christian Schools in America" since The Best Schools (T.B.S.) began its annual rankings.

== Campus ==
Chapel Field's 100 acre campus is located in the Hudson Valley region of New York State. Bridges span the Dwaarkill River, which runs through the center of the campus and is partially fed by the 2.5-acre lake on the southwestern end. The school makes use of 4 buildings and 6 athletic fields.

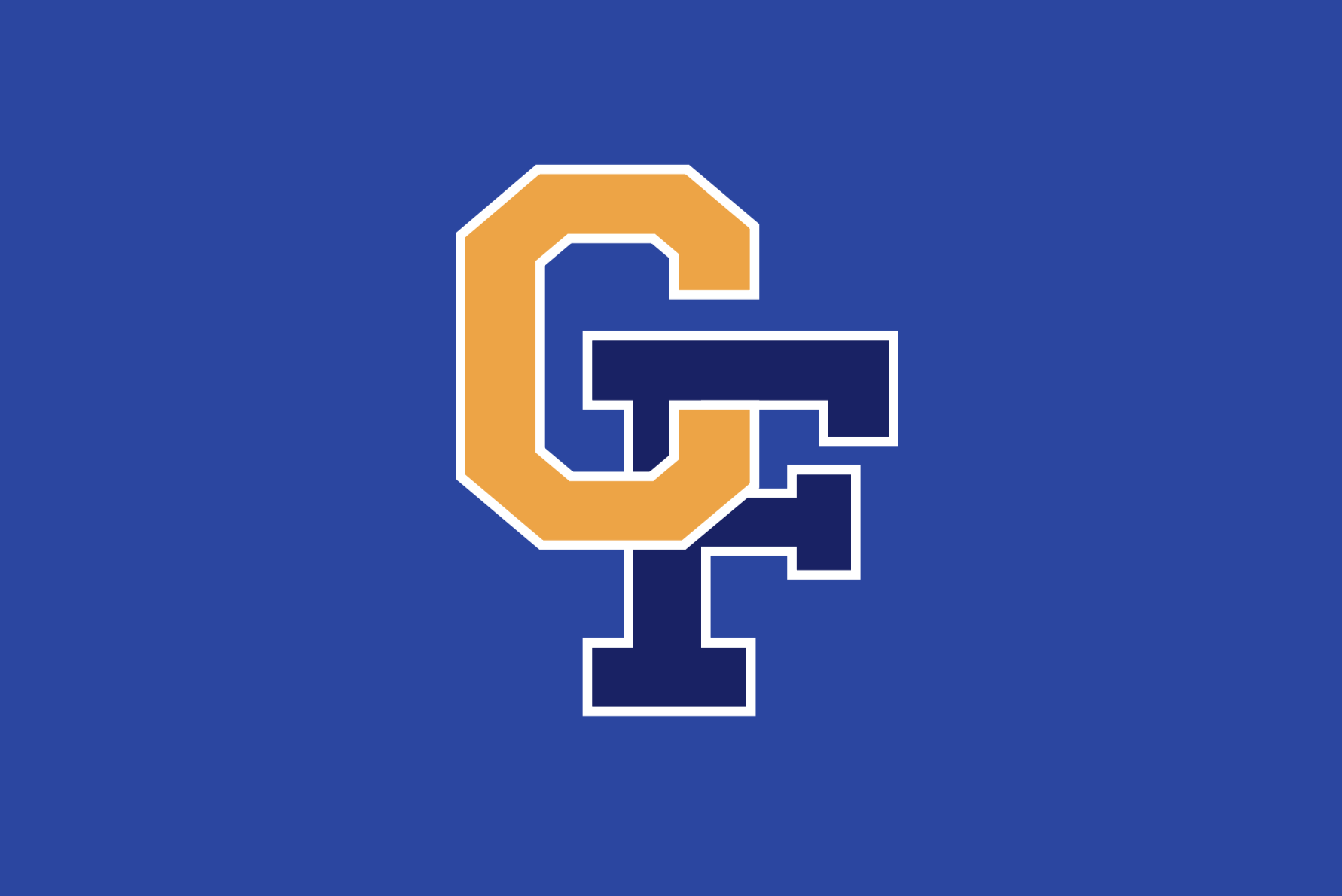
Chapel Field's School Letters

== Athletics ==
Chapel Field is part of the Orange County Interscholastic Athletic Association (OCIAA) in Class D. It is one of only a few private schools in the Hudson Valley that compete athletically with public schools. Since it joined the OCIAA, Chapel Field has won 7 state championships. They participate in varsity, JV, and modified sports, including, Soccer (Boys/Girls); Basketball (Boys/Girls); Baseball (Boys); Softball (Girls); Track (Boys/Girls); Cross Country (Boys/Girls). Students may also potentially participate in other sports, depending on their local public school's policies. The school's mascot is a lion, which comes out of the Bible, where Jesus Christ is referred to as the “Lion of Judah.”
