= Earlham Road Cemetery, Norwich =

Cemetery in Norwich, Norfolk, England

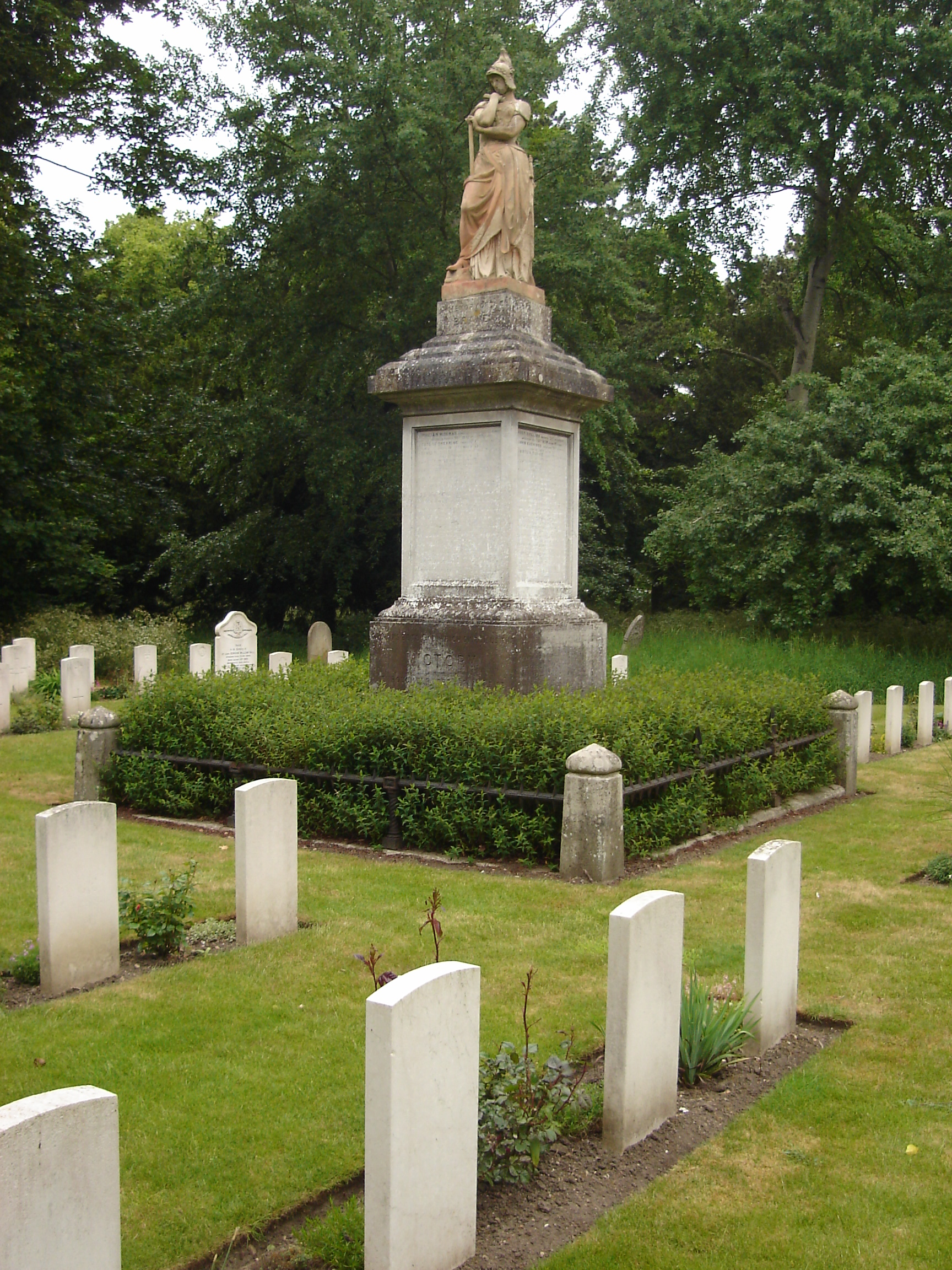
- Spirit of the Army—Armed Science
- Interactive map of Earlham Road Cemetery, Norwich

Details
- Established: 1856
- Location: Norwich
- Country: England
- Coordinates: 52.6324°N 1.2673°E
- Owned by: Norwich City Council
- Size: 34 acres (0.14 km^{2}; 0.053 sq mi)
- Website: Earlham Road Cemetery
- Find a Grave: Earlham Road Cemetery, Norwich

Earlham Road Cemetery, Norwich also known as Earlham Cemetery or Norwich Cemetery is a cemetery located in Norwich which was officially opened on 6 March 1856 and covers 85 acres (34 ha). The cemetery is divided into two distinct sites by Farrow Road A140 which runs north–south across the site. To the east of the road is the original 19th century cemetery and to the west of the road lies the 20th century addition. Today, it caters for all faiths with separate burial grounds and chapels for Jews and Catholics and a growing one for Muslims together with two military cemeteries. The 19th century cemetery is designed with an informal garden cemetery layout with winding paths while the remainder is a more formal grid type which was favoured by cemetery designer John Claudius Loudon. Much of the original cemetery is a County Wildlife Site and contains grassland and a wide selection of mature trees.

== History ==
In the 19th century a link had been established between the overflowing city churchyards and the outbreak of diseases. As a result of a cholera epidemic in the city in 1848–49, the Mayor of Norwich received an order from the Home Secretary that all burials must cease in the city's churchyards from 1 February 1855. A number of possible sites were considered but eventually former farmland in Earlham was acquired and purchased with a loan of £5000 from Gurney's Bank. Edward E Benest, the city surveyor, designed the cemetery to cater for all faiths with consecrated sections for Church of England burials and unconsecrated for non-conformist burials together with a separate burial ground and mortuary chapel for Jews. Included in his original plans were lodges, offices, twin Gothic chapels and the planting of trees and shrubs.

In 1874 a further 15 acres (6.1 ha) were added to the north-east of the site and a Roman Catholic chapel was built. A piece of land was reserved in this new section for the burial of soldiers from the city's Britannia Barracks. Money was raised by public subscription to raise a monument in their memory. A statue designed by John Bell and made by Doultons and named The Spirit of the Army – Armed Science was unveiled by Lord Waveney in 1878. A further 40 acres (16 ha) was purchased in 1892 and by the late-1920s extended beyond Farrow Road to its present size of 85 acres (34 ha). During World War II the city was bombed in the two Baedeker raids in 1942 with 235 civilians losing their lives. A memorial to them was laid out in a section of the cemetery to the west of Farrow Road in 1946.

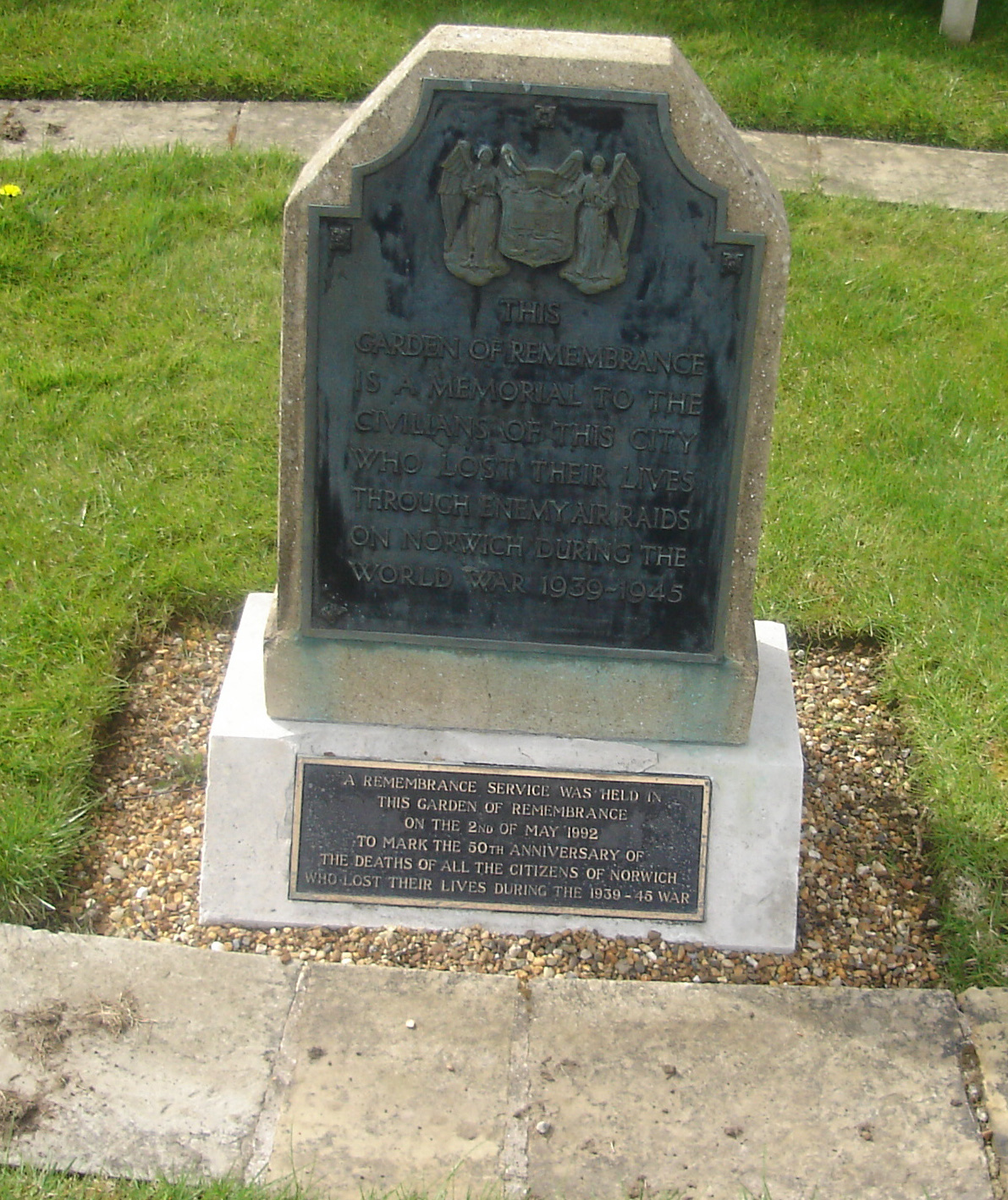
A photo of the Baedeker Blitz civilian memorial in Earlham Road Cemetery.

== Recent history ==
In 1893 the Eastern Daily Press reported that 57,759 people had been buried in the grounds. Today that number is in the hundreds of thousands with burial space limited. After the Second World War cremation became widely used which has helped to alleviate the problem with cremation rates rising to 72.44%. In spite of the popularity of cremation the cemetery is rapidly filling up and this has led to recent proposals for natural burials.

== Notable buildings ==
The principal building in the cemetery is the crematorium, designed by David Percival, to replace the original twin-chapels of Benest's design in 1963–64 and reuses the original fish scale roof tiles. as well as roof timbering. It stands close to the cemetery's main entrance in Earlham Road. By October 1998 the crematorium and the adjacent garden were sold by the local authority to Dignity plc. Approximately 100 metres (330 ft) south of the crematorium stands the Gothic two-storey South Lodge (Benest 1856). The building was sold by auction in 2015. North Lodge is of the same style and date of South Lodge and stands close to the Bowthorpe Road entrance; both buildings housed the cemetery's superintendents. North Lodge's gardens are opened to the public annually, in aid of charity. Adjacent to South Lodge is the gothic flint and tile Roman Catholic chapel (Pearce 1874). Approximately 220 metres (720 ft) north-west of the crematorium and adjacent to Bowthorpe Road is the small brick and tile mortuary chapel standing in the Jewish burial ground designed by Benest in 1856.

== Notable interments ==
Buried close to the Bowthorpe Road entrance lies the grave of eminent local architect, George Skipper.

Founder of the Round Table, Louis Marchesi is interred in the Roman Catholic section of the cemetery.

John Middleton one of the Norwich School of painters is buried close to the main drive adjacent to the crematorium.

Also buried at the cemetery is the former juvenile novelist Daisy Ashford (best known work The Young Visiters).

== War graves ==
There are casualties of the South African War buried in the original cemetery. There are also 550 graves of service personnel that are registered and maintained by the Commonwealth War Graves Commission from the First (nearly 350) and Second World Wars (nearly 200). Nearly half of the First World War graves are in two military plots, one in the north-east and the other in the western sections of the cemetery. Land adjacent the latter was set aside for burying personnel in the Second World War, forming a combined World Wars section with a Cross of Sacrifice a focal point. There is also a special memorial to a serviceman buried among civilian air raid casualties whose grave could not be individually marked by a headstone.

== Location ==
The cemetery is approximately 1.5 miles (2.4 km) west from the city centre. Earlham Road B1108 and Gipsy Lane form the southern boundary with Farrow Road A140 forming the western boundary. Its eastern boundary is formed by private gardens while the northern boundary is bounded by Bowthorpe Road and a short section of Dereham Road A1074.

== Wildlife ==
The cemetery to the east of Farrow Road is a County Wildlife Site and is home to a wide range of wildlife. Over 150 flower species have been recorded together with over 80 tree species being identified. Many of the trees are original plantings from when the cemetery was first established. Also present are many bird species together with numerous insects and mammals including muntjac deer and fox.

== Transport links ==
The main entrance at Earlham Road and the entrances at Dereham Road and Bowthorpe Road are all served by bus services provided by First Norfolk & Suffolk and Konnectbus. They also stop a short distance from the entrances at Farrow Road.
