= Castle Quarter, Norwich =

Shopping mall in Norfolk, England

Castle Quarter

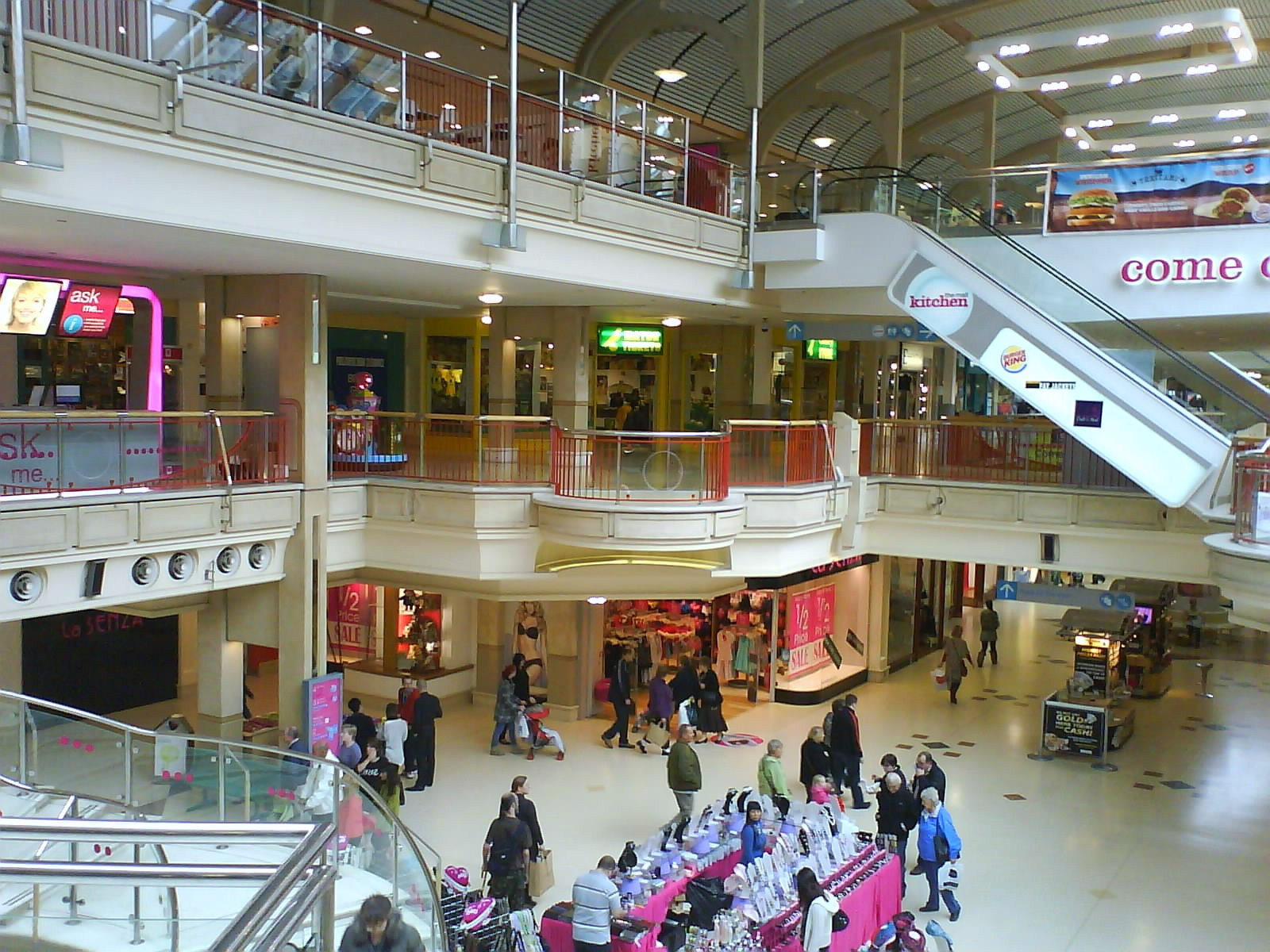
- The interior of the mall in 2010
- Location: Norwich, England
- Coordinates: 52.6274°N 1.2962°E
- Floor area: ~1,000,000 square feet (93,000 m^{2})
- Floors: 4
- Website: castlequarternorwich.co.uk

Castle Quarter, formerly known as Castle Mall and The Mall Norwich, is a shopping centre in Norwich, Norfolk, England. It opened on 23 September 1993 and is one of two shopping centres in Norwich city centre, the other being Chantry Place, a five-minute walk away. It is located close to Norwich Castle.

== Architecture ==
The Castle Mall's four floors were built to cover about 1,000,000 square feet (93,000 m^{2}) and it is largely underground. Each floor connects to street level due to the sloping topography around the site.

== History ==
=== Ideas, excavation and construction ===
The plans for the centre go back to 1977 when Michael Innes, an architect, came up with a plan for a shopping centre in Norwich city centre. He originally planned it to be at Timber Hill, but this was rejected by the local council because of concerns that some listed buildings would be affected by it. So instead, he chose it would be located by the old cattle market by Norwich Castle. He came up with the idea that the centre would be underground and would be connected with Norwich Market and Castle Meadow.

From 1987 and mainly between 1989 and 1991, archaeological excavations were carried out by the Norfolk Archaeological Unit on the site as well as in the Golden Ball Street area; together, these investigated around 21% of the 9.3 hectares (93,000 m^{2}) that make up the castle fee, amounting to one of the largest urban excavations in Europe. The mass removal of earth to a depth of over 20 metres took place over an area of 2 hectares (20,000 m^{2}), and was used to backfill a pit in Keswick to the city's south. The excavation at the mall site uncovered evidence of a medieval churchyard which was used from circa AD 980–1030 to circa AD 990–1050, including burials which presented skeletal evidence of leprosy. A study of the DNA of 17 of the skeletons recovered from the archaeological site found evidence that one young adult male had a mitochondrial DNA haplotype that indicated Romani ethnicity. In a pile of 17th century garbage, archaeologists found two parrot bones which were the first such relics to come from an English historical site.

Construction began in March 1990 and ended in 1993. The first phase would be the demolition of the former Castle Hotel, a five-star hotel that closed in 1989. Several months after the hotel was demolished, the tunnel was excavated below Castle Meadow to make the tunnel and most of the place.

During construction, the surface car park of the previous site and thus the roof of the Castle Mall was replaced by a four-acre city park. The Castle Mall was part of a program to cluster its retail in the city centre; Norwich City Council "aim[ed] to not prevent choice, but to allow more people to have a choice of shopping facilities."

=== Opening ===
The centre finally opened as Castle Mall on 23 September 1993 at a cost of £145 million. The centre included an Argos, Disney Store, Virgin Megastore, Boots (which still remains in the centre to this day) and a food court and various other shops. In 1994, the scheme for the Castle Mall was awarded the Royal Town Planning Institute Silver Jubilee Cup, presented each year to award an exceptional level of planning achievement.

In 1999, an unoccupied area of the centre was redeveloped to a cinema (which is currently owned by Vue). The centre was sold to The Mall Fund in the 2000s and was renamed to The Mall Norwich.

In March 2005, the expected opening of Chapelfield shopping centre in the city in September 2006 led to the planning of a multi-million pound refurbishment of the Castle Mall, including its Argos, Boots and Virgin Records stores, with clothes shop George to also open.

In 2010, the mall hosted 58 separate stores, four restaurants and take-away food outlets, and an eight-screen cinema. In 2012, the centre was sold to InfraRed and was renamed back to Castle Mall. The centre got a new dining quarter in 2015, called the Timberhill Terrace.

=== Change to Castle Quarter ===
In mid-2019, the centre was renamed to Castle Quarter. In 2021, during the COVID-19 pandemic, the food court of Castle Quarter was temporarily converted into a vaccination centre in an attempt to offer mass vaccinations in the East of England.
