= Clone town =

Town where major shopping areas are dominated by chain stores

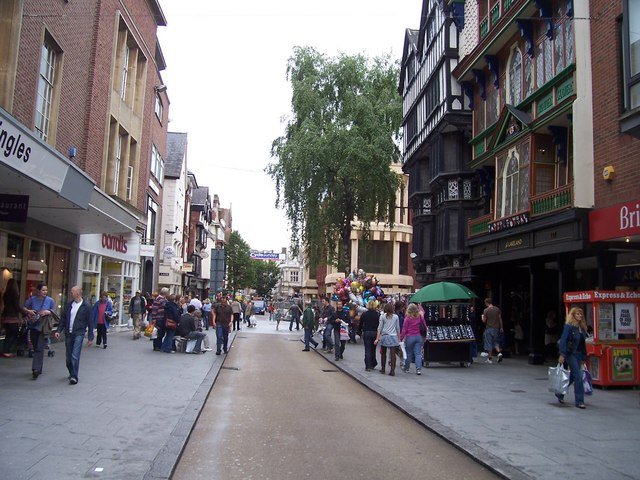
High Street, Exeter, Devon, in 2007. A 2005 survey rated Exeter as the best example of a clone town in the UK.

Clone town is a term for a town where the High Street or other major shopping areas are significantly dominated by chain stores, thus making that town indistinct from other town centres. The term was coined by the New Economics Foundation (NEF), a British think tank, in the 2004 report on "Clone Town Britain".

The report further elaborates the definition as follows: 'Clone towns' occur where 'the individuality of high street shops has been replaced by a monochrome strip of global and national chains' as opposed to 'Home Town' which is a 'place that retains its character and is individually recognizable and distinct to the people who live there, as well as those who visit'.

A survey conducted by the NEF in 2005 estimated that 41% of towns in the UK and 48% of London villages could be considered clone towns, with the trend rising. Alternatively, a clone town can also be looked upon as a stage of growth of the retail market, i.e. from out-of-town retail parks and shopping centres to so-called clone towns dominated by chains.

== Controversy ==
The NEF report argued that the spread of clone towns is highly damaging to society because of the removal of diversity:

- Small business lost out to larger chains. Between 1997 and 2002, independent general stores were estimated to be closing at the rate of one per day, and specialist stores at the rate of 50 per week; customers chose to shop elsewhere.
- Consolidation of large amounts of distribution power in the hands of these companies might lead to danger. For example, magazine editors lobbied the Prime Minister to act to prevent a situation in which a few supermarket brands could control the distribution of magazines and thus effectively censor any publication that they did not like or even force it out of business. The report also found that many suppliers, such as farmers, feared making any public criticism of chain retailers, as the retailer could simply cut their distribution and force them out of business.
- Related to both of the above is the danger of the loss of regional colour. For example, the NEF report found that many supermarket branches in Scotland did not carry, or did not stock, regional Scottish publications.
- The tendency for chain stores and, in particular, supermarkets to locate out of town means that they purchase land that could have been used for housing and thus drive up housing prices since less land is available. This same effect contributes to urban or suburban sprawl and environmental degradation.
- Chain stores and especially supermarkets tend to carry only the few most popular products in certain ranges (for example, the most popular computer games, books and DVDs). Thus, they reduce the range of choice available and remove the most profitable business upon which companies offering greater choice would depend.
- Clone towns create a negative branding effect of a place, by minimising the differentiation and incentive to shop in a particular high street or place.

The NEF report also notes that the creation of chain stores and supermarkets has been in part a response to the consolidation of retail land ownership in the UK. Retailers are forced to consolidate to have any leverage over landlords that have already consolidated.

Other commentators have raised concerns regarding the loss of "sociability" offered by traditional shopping: "the demise of the small shop would mean that people will not just be disadvantaged in their role as consumers but also as members of communities – the erosion of small shops is viewed as the erosion of the 'social glue' that binds communities together, entrenching social exclusion in the UK".

== Examples ==
The 2005 survey rated Exeter as the worst example of a clone town in the UK, with only a single independent store in the city's high street and less diversity (in terms of different categories of shop) than any other town surveyed. As of 2019, this final independent shop has closed.

Other extreme clone towns in England include Stafford, Middlesbrough, Weston-super-Mare and Winchester.

== See also ==
- The World's End - 2013 science fiction comedy film taking place in a clone town
- Wabi-sabi - Japanese aesthetic focused on uniqueness and imperfection
