= West Lothian College =

College in Livingston, Scotland

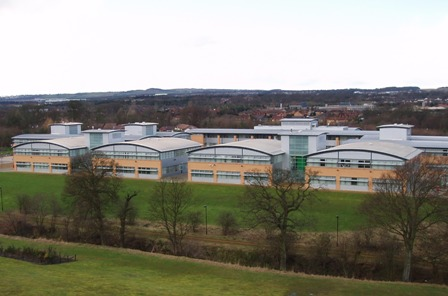
- Motto: Where You Can
- Type: College of Further and Higher Education
- Established: 1965 (relocated 2001)
- Principal: Jackie Galbraith
- Administrative staff: Approx 300 FTE
- Students: 8,000
- Location: West Lothian College, Almondvale Crescent, Livingston, EH54 7EP, Scotland, UK; 55°53′2.96″N 3°31′31.36″W
- Campus: Livingston
- Colours: Royal Blue, Grey and mauve semi-arches
- Website: http://www.west-lothian.ac.uk/

West Lothian College is a further and higher education institution in Livingston, West Lothian, Scotland. The Principal of the college is Jackie Galbraith, who was previously Vice-Principal at Ayrshire College.

== History ==
The college has been located in Livingston since July 2001, with its previous campus located in Bathgate (at the vacant original Bathgate Academy building) from 1965. The new campus, built at a cost of approximately £10 million, is located in the town centre, close to the Almondvale football stadium, Livingston indoor commercial centre and the retail complex (previously MacArthur Glen, later Livingston Designer Outlet).

From 2008 to 2018, the principal of the college was Mhairi Harrington, OBE.

As of 2021, the college provided courses to over 8,000 students. The college had announced ambitious plans to raise its 2006 enrollment level of 6000 students to nearly 10,000 students by 2010/11, but this was interrupted by council funding cuts, and so places have been scaled back to approximately 8,000 in the 2011/2012 year, a decrease of almost 1,000 places from the 2010/2011 year. It was previously announced in old plans that the number of placements had to be increased to meet the new demand for courses, in response to the economic downturn, affecting otherwise employed people in the area; however, now monetary obligations, with the West Lothian Council's budget being decreased by 12% in the 2011/12 financial year alone, have taken clear priority.

In February 2021, the college announced new plans for a £500,000 extension to its construction and engineering workshops.

In April 2021, West Lothian College staff voted for Industrial action due to the introduction of lower paid instructors posts to replace lecturers.

== Courses ==
West Lothian College is an incorporated College of Further Education, offering vocational and non-vocational courses to school leavers from S4 - S6, adults, and through an external partnership, S1 - S3 secondary students as well. It is situated in the Central Belt of Scotland, approximately midway between Edinburgh and Glasgow. The College delivers SQA accredited qualifications from Access 2, Access 3 and Intermediate 1 for Adult returners and special needs learners, to NQ Intermediate 2, Higher and HNC/D Level, in Computing, Engineering, Care, Art and Design, Business Management, and the Social Sciences, amongst others. Plans have been rolled out, in partnership with Napier University, to confer BAs through part-time courses to students wishing to further their education also, the first being awarded in the subject of Business Management.

The principal subjects supported by West Lothian college are –

- Healthcare and Care
- Social Science
- Computing
- Electronics
- Digital Skills
- Renewables
- Hospitality
- Business Management - Up to Honours degree level in coordination with Edinburgh Napier University
- Creative Industries - Art, Design
- Image and Beauty – Beauty Therapy, Hairdressing
- Sport and Fitness
- Core Skills – Communication, Numeracy, ICT
- Assisted Learning
- Construction
- Automotive Engineering
- English for Speakers of Other Languages

In recognition of the many social barriers that restrict individuals from accessing education and training, West Lothian College has developed a number of initiatives that promote wider access to vocational training.

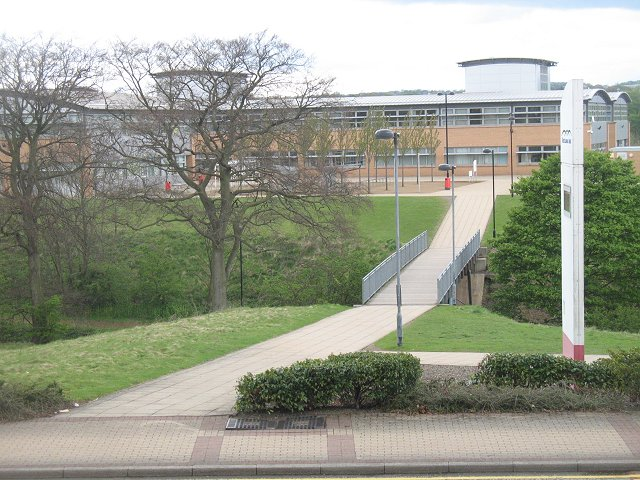
West Lothian College, Pedestrian entrance

The college works in partnership with a number of statutory and voluntary organisations. In relation to young, unemployed people, they are currently engaged with West Lothian Council, Developing the Young Workforce, West Lothian and West Lothian Community Planning Partnership, in developing training and education programmes for socially excluded young people. Programmes include Modern Apprenticeships and the Flexible Workforce Development Fund Scottish Funding Council, Project Search (full-time training for school leavers facing multiple barriers to the World of Work) with West Lothian Council, and the promotion of community learning centres, also with West Lothian Council.

== Schools Partnership ==
The Schools College partnership is an initiative by West Lothian College to introduce a taste of 'adult education lifestyle' to students yet to have left S4 - S6, starting from S3 (typically when students of all Schools have started their National 5s or Intermediate subjects.) Course levels typically range from NQ Intermediates to NQ Higher with additional Units typically only taken at Further Education institutions in Scotland. It is promoted as a great addition to the development of one's education by the college.

The college is a provider of Foundation Apprenticeships. These qualifications are aimed at school students in S4-S6 and are studied through attendance at College combined with work experience with a local employer. The qualification combines awards for underpinning knowledge combined with awards for professional competence in a work setting. These qualifications can progress to employment, a Modern Apprenticeship, a Graduate Apprenticeship or Higher Education courses either at College or University.

The college actively engages with employers both directly and through its partnerships with the DYW (Developing Young Workforce), West Lothian Council, West Lothian Chamber of Commerce and Skills Development Scotland. The primary purpose of this engagement is to ensure the College Curriculum is developed to ensure learners have the skills employers need in order to grow their businesses and the regional economy. The college has active engagement with over 600 West Lothian Businesses and all full time students at the college receive experience of the World of Work as part of that course with most undertaking extensive placement in employer businesses to develop the skills they have been taught in classrooms and workshops.

West Lothian College is a provider of Workforce Development, delivering qualifications which professionalise and upskill workers and volunteers to become recognised for their competence in their roles. The college is contracted to deliver training for the Children's Hearings Scotland Learning Academy with the responsibility for the professional development of around 2,700 volunteers who sit on Children's Panels throughout Scotland. The college is also a provider of Care SVQs (Social Services and Healthcare and Social Services, Children and Young People) as well as being a provider of SVQs in a range of other subjects.
