= The Brighton Pier Group =

British leisure and hospitality company

The Brighton Pier Group Limited
- Trade name: The Brighton Pier Group
- Type: Private
- Industry: Hospitality; Leisure; Tourism
- Founded: 2006; 20 years ago
- Headquarters: Brighton, England, United Kingdom
- Area served: United Kingdom
- Key people: Anne Ackord (CEO); Luke Johnson (chairman)
- Subsidiaries: Paradise Island Adventure Golf
- Website: www.brightonpiergroup.com

The Brighton Pier Group Limited (BPG), formerly known as Eclectic Bar Group, is a British leisure and hospitality company that has owned the Brighton Palace Pier since April 2016.

The company has owned Paradise Island Adventure Golf since December 2017 and formerly owned Lightwater Valley from June 2021 to January 2026.

== History ==
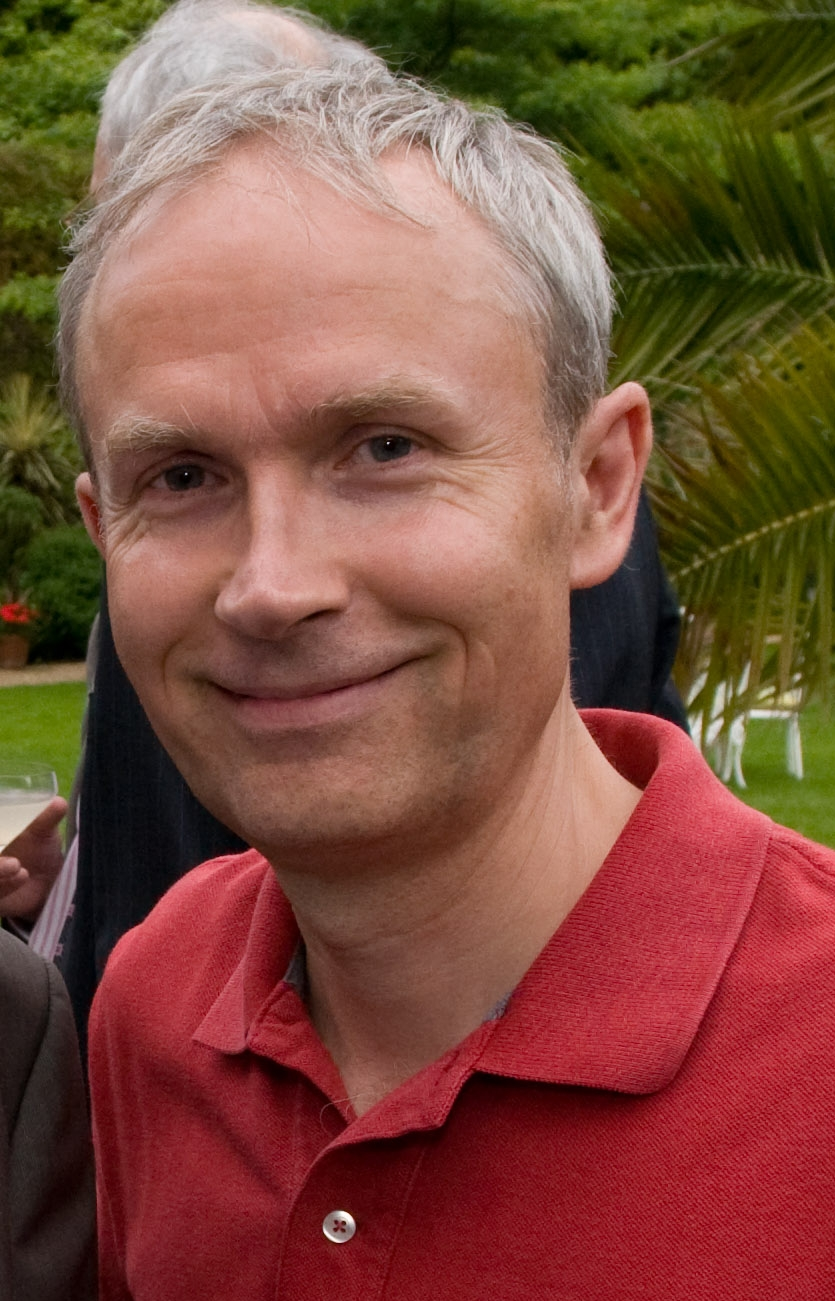
Luke Johnson in 2011

In November 2013, Eclectic Bar Group floated on the Alternative Investment Market (AIM).

In June 2015, Luke Johnson, the former chairman of Channel 4, invested £1.5 million into Eclectic Bar Group and became its executive chairman.

In April 2016, Eclectic Bar Group acquired the Brighton Marine Palace and Pier Company, the operator of the Brighton Pier, for £18 million. Following the acquisition, the company renamed itself as The Brighton Pier Group and chief executive Reuben Harley resigned. Johnson also stated that the company's focus had moved from operating bars to operating visitor attractions.

In July 2016, the company renamed the pier to the Brighton Palace Pier. The pier had originally been named the Brighton Marine Palace and Pier prior to 2000.

The company acquired Lethington Leisure Limited, trading as Paradise Island Adventure Golf, for £10.5 million in December 2017. The company also bought Lightwater Valley, an amusement park in North Yorkshire, for £5 million in June 2021. That same month, the company apologised after it was reported that hundreds of customers had been incorrectly overcharged £2,100 for tickets to Brighton Palace Pier.

In July 2023, it was reported that the company lost about 25% of its value. The group cited railway strikes, poor weather and the nearby Royal Albion Hotel fire as reasons for declining sales. In May 2024, the company introduced an admission fee of £1 due to rising costs. In March 2025, the admission fee was increased to £2. The admission fee did not apply to those with a local residents card.

In April 2025, the company announced it would deregister from AIM and became a private limited company.

In October 2025, the company confirmed it was selling Lightwater Valley. The company also put Paradise Island Adventure Golf on the market in December 2025. Lightwater Valley was sold to the Mellors Group in January 2026 for £3 million.

In January 2026, it was announced that the company would be selling Brighton Palace Pier. The group's chief executive Anne Ackord said the sale was part of the company's "strategy to divest our leisure assets and return capital to shareholders".
