= Warner Village =

Warner Village can refer to:

- Warner Village, New Jersey, an unincorporated community in the United States
- Warner Village Cinemas, a defunct chain of multiplex theaters in the United Kingdom
- Warner Village Theme Parks, the former name of Village Roadshow Theme Parks, a group of theme parks located in the United States and Australia
