= Paradise Island Adventure Golf =

British indoor leisure company

Lethington Leisure Limited
- Trade name: Paradise Island Adventure Golf
- Type: Subsidiary
- Industry: Leisure
- Founded: 2005; 21 years ago
- Founders: Edward Dantzic; Joshua Dantzic
- Headquarters: Renfrew, Scotland, United Kingdom
- Number of locations: 7
- Area served: United Kingdom
- Key people: Craig Nichol (marketing manager)
- Parent: The Brighton Pier Group
- Website: www.paradiseislandgolf.com

Lethington Leisure Limited, trading as Paradise Island Adventure Golf (PIAG), (Note: Often shortened to Paradise Island.) is a British indoor leisure company operating a chain of adventure golf venues across seven locations in England and Scotland.

Founded by Edward and Joshua Dantzic in 2005, the company has been a subsidiary of The Brighton Pier Group since its acquisition in December 2017. It is an affiliate member of both England and Scotland's national golf governing bodies.

== History ==
Lethington Leisure Limited was founded in 2005 by father and son Edward "Eddie" Dantzic and Joshua Dantzic. In a 2006 Evening Times interview, Joshua Dantzic, then aged 24, said that he was still living with his parents and had aspired to be his own boss since childhood.

Lethington Leisure was acquired by The Brighton Pier Group in December 2017 for £10.5 million as part of the company's strategy of buying "growing experiential leisure and entertainment destinations" according to its executive chairman Luke Johnson. Following the acquisition, Joshua Dantzic remained the company's director whilst Edward Dantzic was appointed as an independent non-executive director.

In January 2019, the company launched an augmented reality mobile app for customers to use whilst playing the courses.

In February 2024, the company became an affiliate member of England Golf. In January 2025, the company became an affiliate member of Scottish Golf after a vote by members. This made it the first member of Scottish Golf to not be a golf club.

In December 2025, it was announced that the Brighton Pier Group would be selling Paradise Island Adventure Golf and were looking for a buyer.

== Locations ==
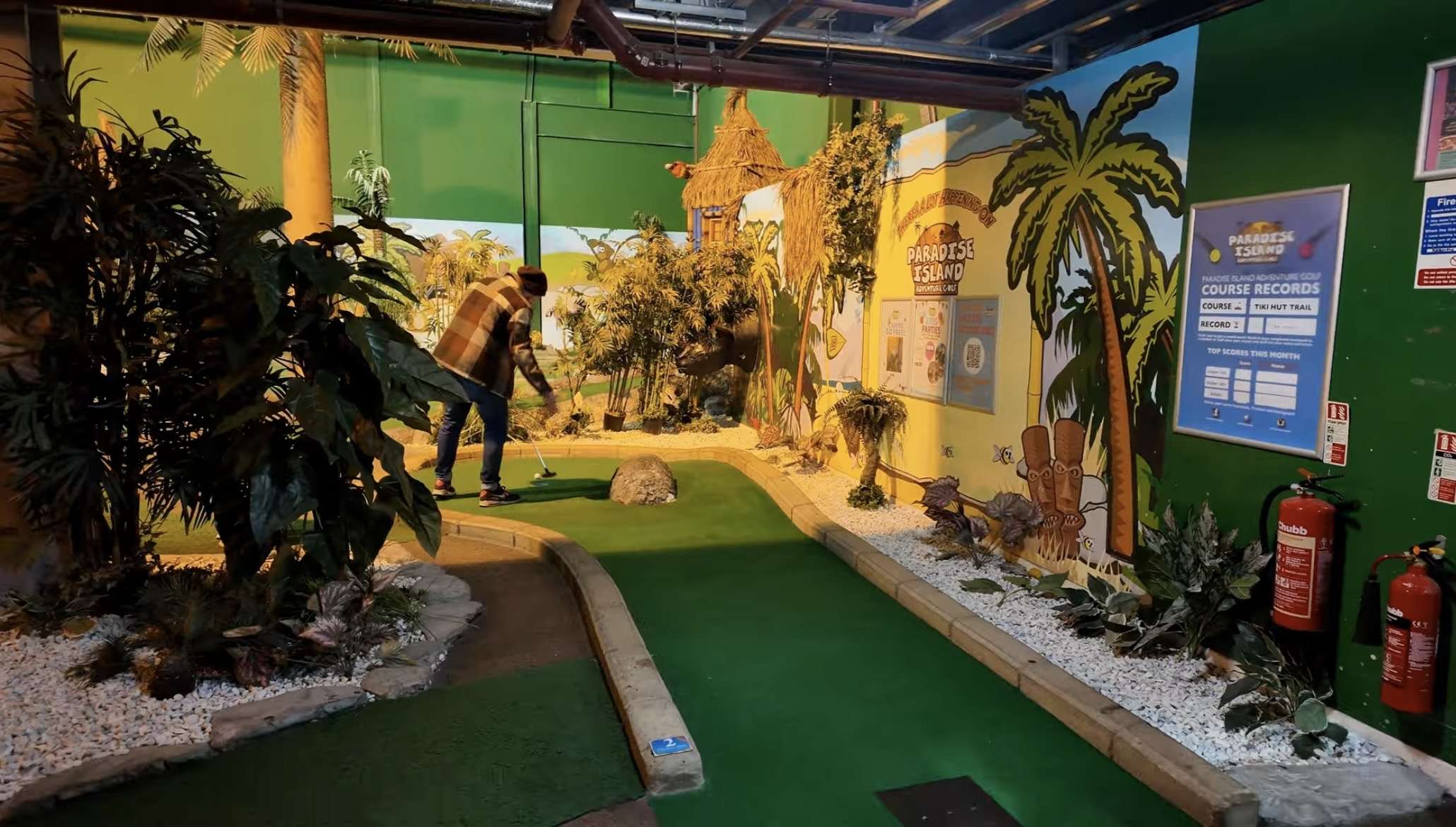
The Braehead venue in February 2026

Each Paradise Island Adventure Golf venue features two 18-hole indoor adventure golf courses occupying more than 13,000 sq ft.

The company's first venue was opened at Xscape Braehead in Renfrew in July 2006. The company opened a second venue at Trafford Centre in Manchester in 2008. Its Valley Centertainment venue in Sheffield opened in 2012. The company also opened its second venue in Scotland that same year at the Livingston Designer Outlet in West Lothian.

The companies' Cheshire Oaks and Intu Derby venues opened in 2017. A Paradise Island Adventure Golf venue opened in Rushden Lakes in Northamptonshire in April 2019. Followed by a venue at The Barcode in Plymouth which opened in October 2019.

The company's Livingston venue closed in August 2025 and was replaced by a trampoline park.
