= McArthurGlen Group =

Shopping mall operator

McArthurGlen UK Limited
- Industry: Shopping mall operator
- Founded: 1993; 33 years ago
- Founders: Cheryl McArthur, Alan Glen, Kaempfer Partners
- Number of locations: 22 (Jan 2026)
- Area served: Austria; Canada; France; Germany; Italy; Netherlands; Spain; United Kingdom; Belgium (formerly); Greece (formerly)
- Website: Official website

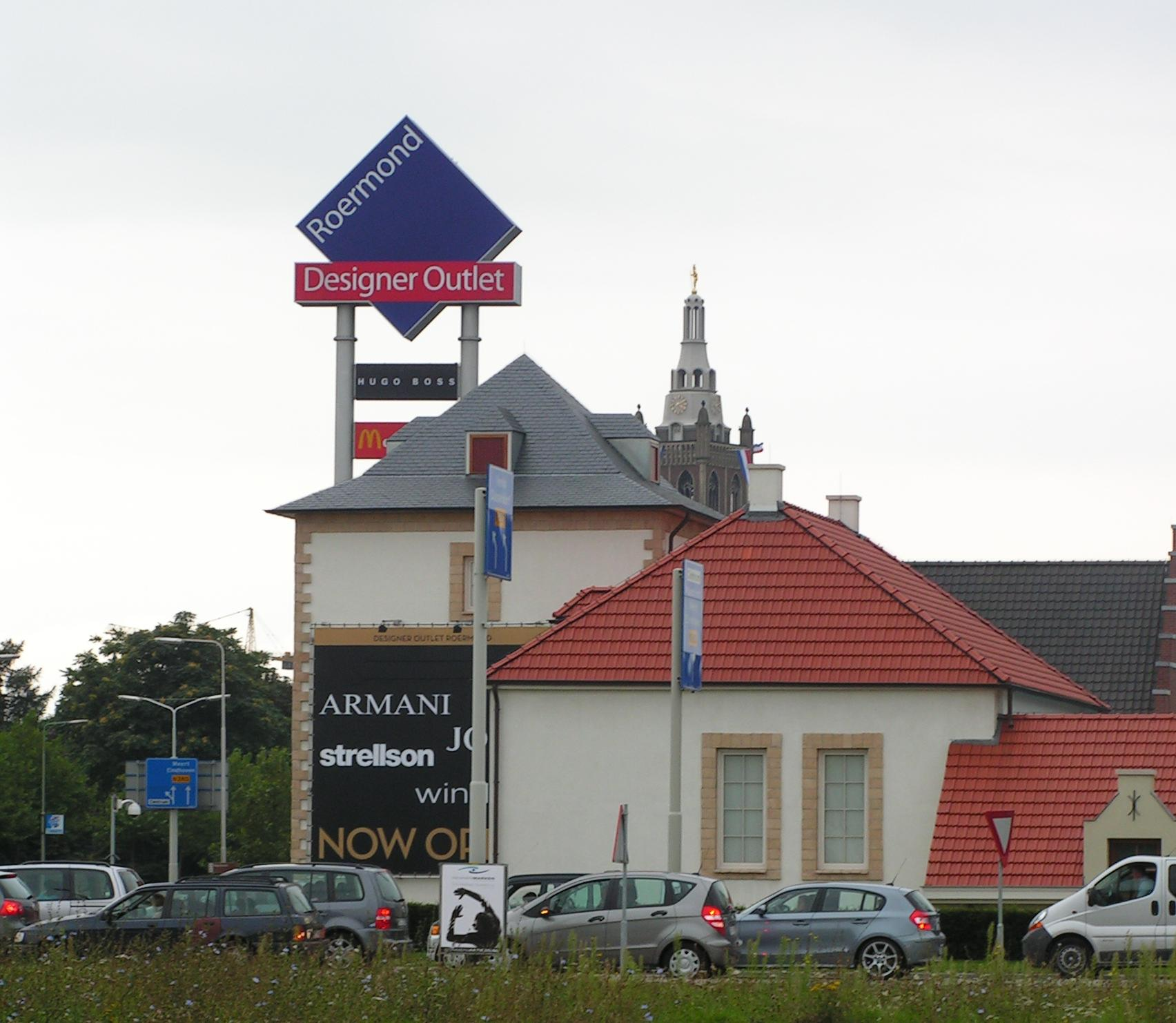
Roermond Designer Outlet in the Netherlands

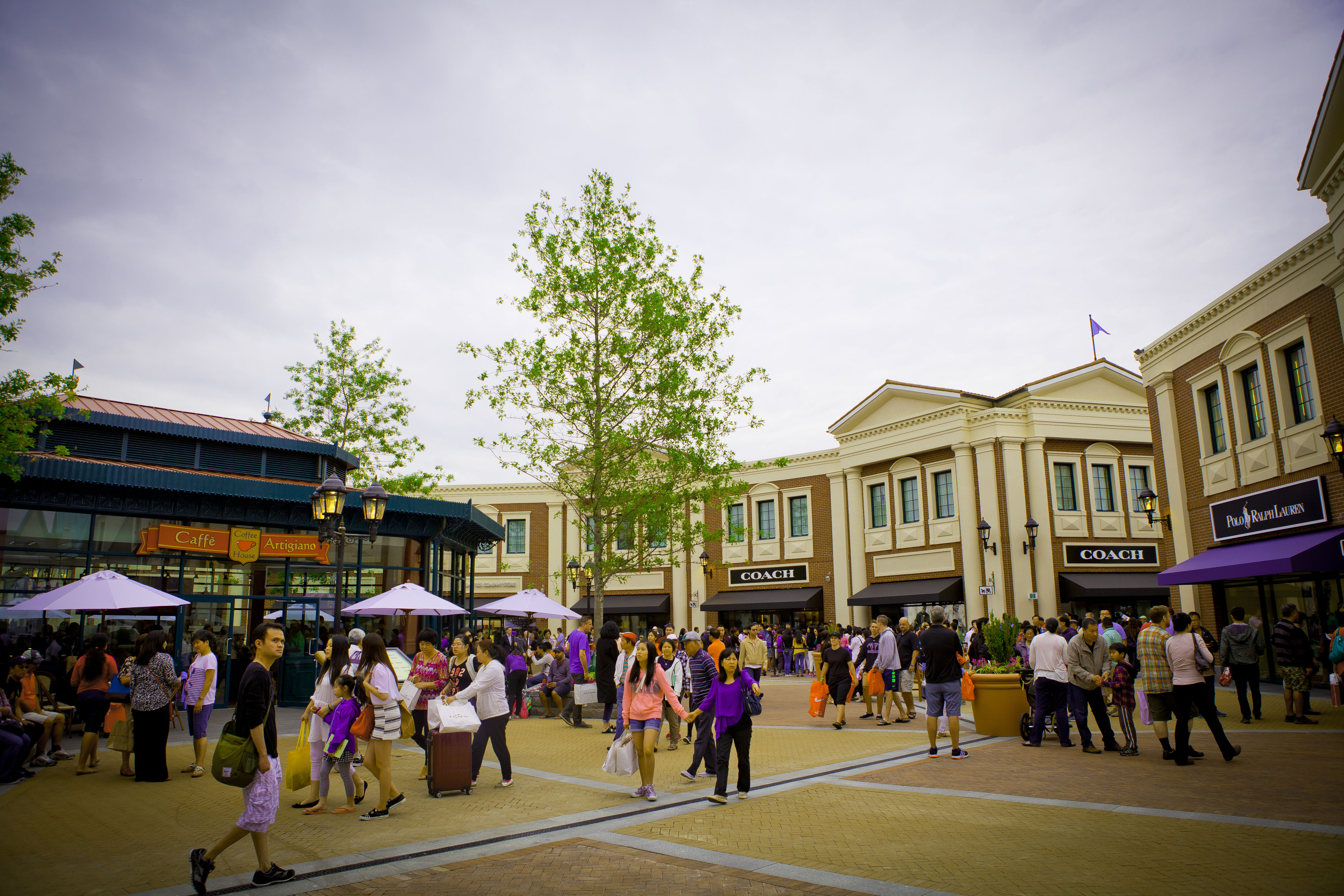
McArthurGlen Designer Outlet at the Vancouver International Airport

McArthurGlen UK Limited (trading as McArthurGlen Group) is a British shopping mall operator, founded in 1993.

The group manages 22 shopping malls across the UK and Europe, and has a singular location in Canada. Its destinations are often self-branded as McArthurGlen outlets. The group specializes in factory outlet and luxury retail shopping malls.

== Background ==
In 1986, Cheryl McArthur and Alan Glen founded McArthur/Glen Realty Corp in the United States, a real estate investment trust, which was later folded into Horizon Shopping Malls in the 1990s.

In April 1993, McArthur and Glen, alongside Kaempfer Partners, founded McArthurGlen UK Limited as a separate company to the former American namesake. It opened its first mall in 1995, the Cheshire Oaks Designer Outlet.

In June 2013, Simon Property Group purchased a stake in the McArthurGlen Group.

On 9 July 2015, McArthurGlen Group opened its first outlet in North America at Vancouver Airport.

During 2025 and 2026, three McArthurGlen properties were sold to Frasers Group, the properties sold were Swindon Designer Outlet, East Midlands Designer Outlet, and York Designer Outlet. They were all rebranded under the Frasers Plus brand.

== Current operations ==
=== Canada ===
Outlet	Location	Retail area	Shops	Opened	Owner
McArthurGlen Designer Outlet Vancouver Airport	Richmond (Metro Vancouver), British Columbia, Canada.	22,297 m^{2} (240,000 sq ft - Phase 1)	approx. 80	July 9, 2015 (Phase 1); August 29, 2019 (Phase 2)	McArthurGlen Group & Vancouver Airport Authority

=== United Kingdom ===
Outlet	Location	Retail area	Shops	Opened	Owner
Ashford	Ashford, Kent, England	26,477 m^{2} (285,000 sq ft)	130	March 2000	McArthurGlen Group
Bridgend	Bridgend, Wales	22,700 m^{2} (244,400 sq ft)	92	May 1998	M&G Real Estate
Cheshire Oaks	Ellesmere Port, Cheshire, England	37,000 m^{2} (400,000 sq ft)	148	March 1995	LaSalle Investment Management
West Midlands	Cannock, England	26,477 m^{2} (285,000 sq ft)	130	12 April 2021	McArthurGlen Group & Aviva Investors & the Richardson family.

=== Europe ===
Outlet	Location	Retail area	Shops	Opened
Castel Romano Designer Outlet	Castel Romano, Italy	25,000 m^{2} (269,100 sq ft)	117	October 2003, 2nd phase November 2006
McArthurGlen Designer Outlet Neumünster	Neumünster, Germany	20,000 m^{2}	140	September 2012, 2nd phase 2015, 3rd phase 2020
La Reggia Designer Outlet	Marcianise, Italy	26,400 m^{2} (283,700 sq ft)	149	February 2010, 2nd phase October 2010, 3rd phase September 2011
Designer Outlet Parndorf	Parndorf, Austria	42,120 m^{2} (453,190 sq ft)	168	August 1998
Designer Outlet Paris Giverny	Giverny, France	20,000 m^{2} (215,278 sq ft)	100	April 27, 2023
Designer Outlet Roermond	Roermond, The Netherlands	45,000 m^{2} (484,376 sq ft)	200	November 2001, 2nd phase January 2005, 3rd phase October 2010, 4th phase April 2017
McArthurGlen Roosendaal	Roosendaal, The Netherlands	23,000 m^{2} (247,567 sq ft)	77	November 2006
Designer Outlet Salzburg	Salzburg, Austria	28,000 m^{2} (304,35 sq ft)	131	October 2009
Serravalle Designer Outlet	Serravalle Scrivia, Italy	39,000 m^{2} (420,500 sq ft)	185	September 2000, 3rd phase December 2002, 4th phase February 2006
McArthurGlen Troyes	Troyes, France	29,500 m^{2} (317,500 sq ft)	120	October 1995
Noventa di Piave Designer Outlet	Noventa di Piave, Italy	18,900 m^{2} (202,900 sq ft)	150	September 2008, 2nd phase in Spring 2012
McArthurGlen Designer Outlet Ochtrup	Ochtrup, Germany	11,500 m^{2} (123,785 sq ft)	65	March 2016
McArthurGlen Málaga Designer Outlet	Málaga, Spain	17,500 m^{2} (188,368 sq ft)	100	February 2020
McArthurGlen Provence	Miramas, Provence, France	25,000 m^{2}	120	April 2017
McArthurGlen Roubaix	Roubaix, France	17,300 m^{2} (183,000 sq ft)	75	19 August 1999

== Former operations ==
Outlet	Location	Retail area	Shops	Opened
McArthurGlen Athens	Spata, Greece	21,100 m^{2} (227,160 sq ft)	124	June 2011 (sold in December 2022, no longer a McArthurGlen property)
Designer Outlet Berlin	Elstal, Germany	21,000 m^{2} (255,960 sq ft)	110	June 2009, 2nd phase September 2010 (sold in May 2025, no longer a McArthurGlen property)
Barberino Designer Outlet	Barberino di Mugello, Italy	25,000 m^{2} (269,100 sq ft)	103	March 2006 (management transferred to Promos Group in July 2024, no longer a McArthurGlen property)
McArthurGlen Luxembourg	Messancy, Belgium	24,000 m^{2}	50	April 2011 (sold in October 2022, no longer a McArthurGlen property)
McArthurGlen Livingston	Livingston, Scotland	28,000 m^{2}	70	October 2000 (sold in 2017, no longer a McArthurGlen property)
Swindon Designer Outlet	Swindon, England	22,300 m^{2}	100	January 1997 (sold in 2025, no longer a McArthurGlen property)
