= Cheshire Oaks =

Cheshire Oaks may refer to:

- Cheshire Oaks (horse race), a horse race run at Chester Racecourse
- Cheshire Oaks Designer Outlet, an outlet centre at Ellesmere Port in England
- Cheshire Oaks Arena, a stadium at Ellesmere Port
