= Cheshire Oaks Designer Outlet =

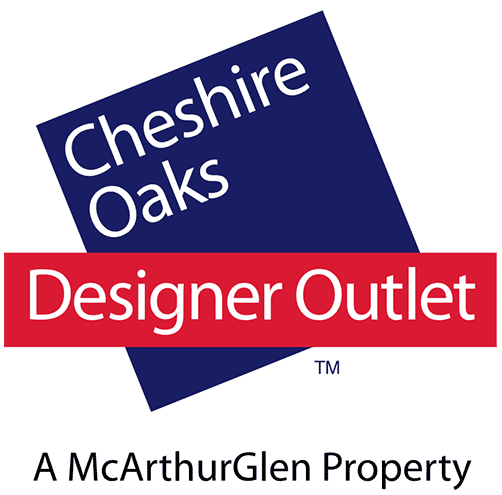

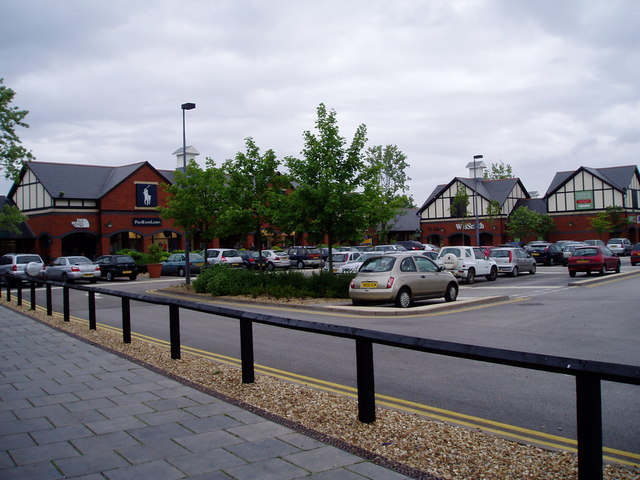
- Location: Ellesmere Port, Cheshire, England
- Coordinates: 53.2651°N 02.8843°W
- Opened: March 1995; 31 years ago
- Num. of stores: 145
- Floor area: 31,300 m^{2} (337,000 sq ft)
- Floors: 1
- Parking: Yes
- Website: www.mcarthurglen.com/en/outlets/uk/designer-outlet-cheshire-oaks//

Cheshire Oaks Designer Outlet is an outlet centre in Ellesmere Port, Cheshire, England.

Located off Junction 10 of the M53, it is the largest outlet centre in the United Kingdom, with 145 stores and the first designer outlet village in Europe, when it opened in March 1995. It is run by McArthurGlen, and has a wide range of outlet stores run by large brands. As factory outlets, the stores primarily offer goods from previous seasons at discounted prices.

It is a large local employer, with its own JobCentre Plus and retail training academy. Brands include AllSaints, Mountain Warehouse, Levi's, Burberry, The North Face, Fred Perry, Calvin Klein Jeans,Polo Ralph Lauren, Molton Brown, Diesel, Tommy Hilfiger, Whittard of Chelsea, Nike Factory Store, Joules and Henri Lloyd.

There is a leisure park, the Coliseum, located adjacent to the centre, with more shops, a Tenpin bowling alley, a Vue Cinema, and Airhop and Paradise Island Adventure Golf. Places to eat across the two sites include Bella Italia, Miller and Carter Grill, Nando's, Chiquito, Prezzo, Harry Ramsden's, McDonald's, Gails, TGI Friday's, Giraffe, Pizza Express and Wagamama. From 2000–2012 The Coliseum was home to Destiny and Elite, one of the largest nightclubs in north-west England.

The centre hosts a winter village.
