= The Barcode =

Entertainment complex in Plymouth, England

- Coordinates: 50.3708°N 4.1365°W
- Address: The Barcode, Drake Circus, Plymouth
- Opened: October 2019
- Owner: British Land
- Architect: Corstorphine & Wright
- Num. of stores: 12
- Floor area: 106,000 feet (32,000 m)
- Parking: 420
- Website: drakecircus.com/barcode

The Barcode is a 106,000-square-foot entertainment complex in the centre of Plymouth, England, and opened on 21 October 2019. It is Plymouth's biggest entertainment complex.

The building was designed by Warwick-based architects Corstorphine & Wright and built by McLaren Construction Group. It is situated adjacent to Drake Circus Shopping Centre on the site of the Bretonside bus station. The complex cost £53 million to build and was originally called Drake Circus Leisure.

The Barcode contains a 12-screen cinema including the UK's third largest IMAX screen, restaurants, and a Paradise Island Adventure Golf venue. The IMAX screen was the first in Plymouth.

== History ==
In 2014, British Land put plans forward to Plymouth City Council regarding a redevelopment at the site of the 1950s Bretonside bus station, which would be demolished. Planning permission was approved by the council in 2015 and works began in 2017. The scheme was originally planned to cost £40 million.

The building officially opened on 21 October 2019 with a selection of outlets opening on the day, the rest of the stores opened the following days. The businesses in the complex created 350 jobs.

Hours after the complex opened someone changed its name on Google to "Drake McCircus: The McBarcode"

In 2022, the street above The Barcode's underground parking began leaking water into the car park due to heavy rainfall.

== Reception ==
Locals in Plymouth gave the building the nickname "The Barcode" during construction due to the building's appearance, that led to owner British Land to rename the site to match the name. The Barcode was a finalist in the Structural Steel Design Awards in 2020.

The Barcode was initially controversial, with some local residents disliking the new building saying that the complex was unnecessary.

== Gallery ==
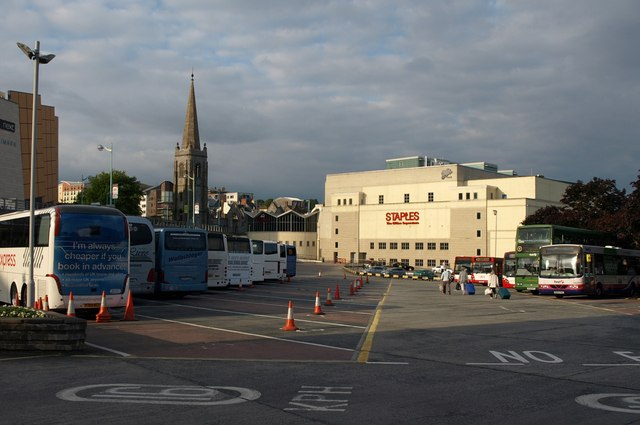
The old bus station was demolished in 2017

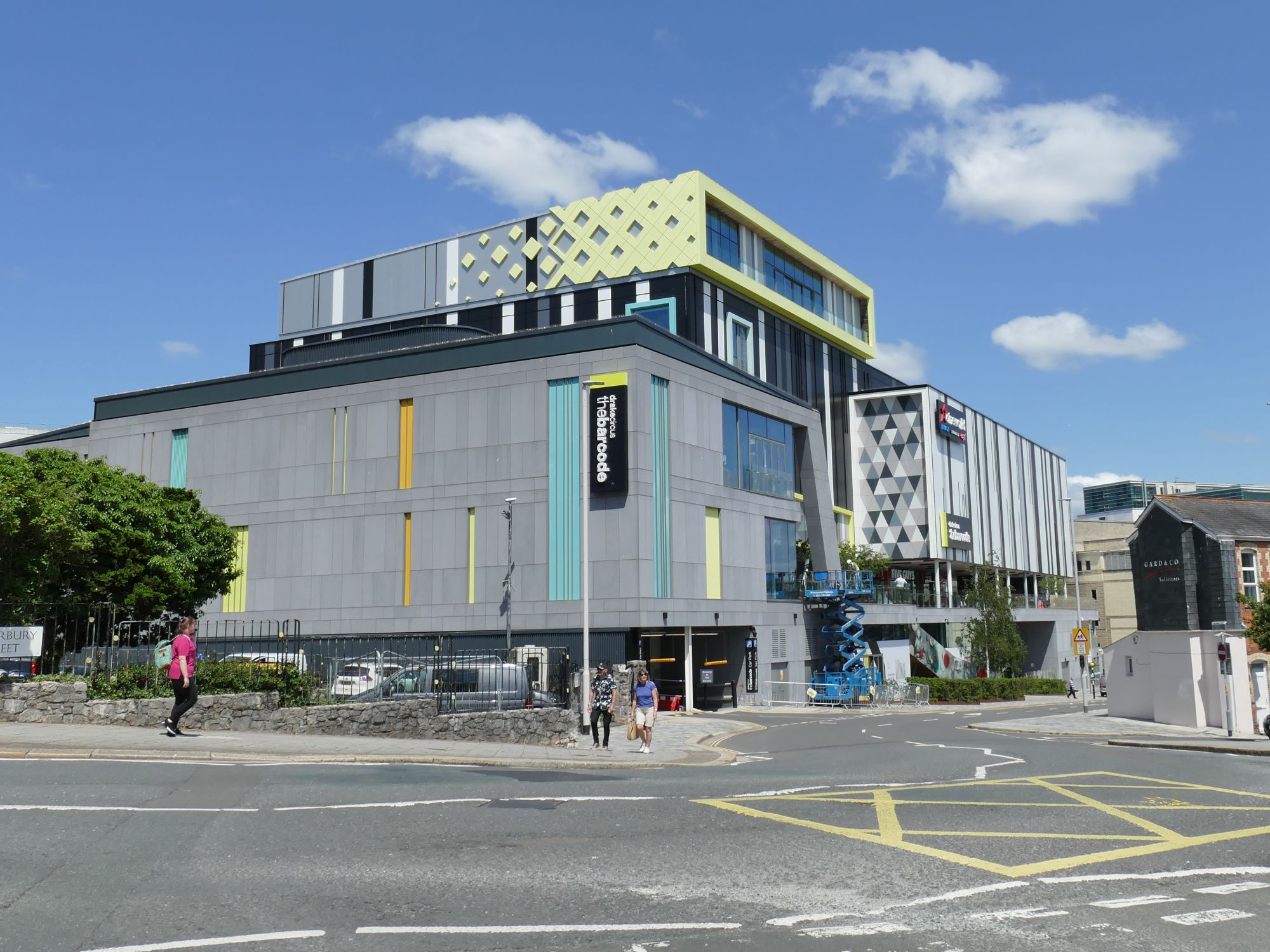
The rear of the complex in 2023
