= Ster Century =

- Formerly: City Cinemas
- Predecessor: Ster-Kinekor
- Founded: 1996; 30 years ago
- Headquarters: Slovakia

Ster Century is a Slovak cinema company, formerly known as City Cinemas.

The brand was formerly used in the UK, Spain, Greece, Poland, Hungary and the Czech Republic as a division of the South African cinema chain, Ster-Kinekor. Their UK head office was based in Camberley in Surrey.

There was one Ster Century cinema in Dublin, Ireland, and six in the UK: Basingstoke, Cardiff, Edinburgh, Leeds, Norwich, and Romford. The Dublin Liffey Valley Shopping Centre cinema – the first Ster Century to open – was one of the largest in Ireland or the UK, in terms of footfall. Of the six UK based sites, Norwich was the first to open in Autumn 2000.

== History ==
Established in 1996, the company was a spin-off from the South African cinema chain, Ster-Kinekor. Ster Century's first cinema was opened in 1998 in partnership with Assos Odeon, a cinema company based in Greece, under the name Ster Odeon.

In 1999 Ster Century opened its first cinemas under its own brand. By the end of the year it had operations in Dublin, Ireland; Prague and Brno, Czech Republic; Wrocław and Warsaw, Poland; and Budapest, Hungary.

Development continued in 2000 with further cinemas opened in the UK, Spain, Greece, Slovakia and additional sites in Poland and the Czech Republic.

By mid-2002 Ster Century had sold off its interests in Poland, Greece, Hungary and the Czech Republic to concentrate on its operations in Ireland and the UK.

In 2003 Ster Century's assets in Ireland and the UK were sold to Aurora Entertainment in a Management buy-out, with remaining assets in Spain and Slovakia being sold off to local cinema operators. In 2005, it was sold again to Vue, and the cinemas have been completely re-branded to Vue's identity since then.

All Ster Century Cinemas that have been re-branded still have some smaller elements (seat covers, "no phone use" signs, cinema lighting, carpet, etc.) that read "Ster Century" or bear the Ster Century logo.

The brand has recently been revived in Slovakia, following the renaming of City Cinemas.
