= Drake Circus Shopping Centre =

Shopping mall in Plymouth, Devon

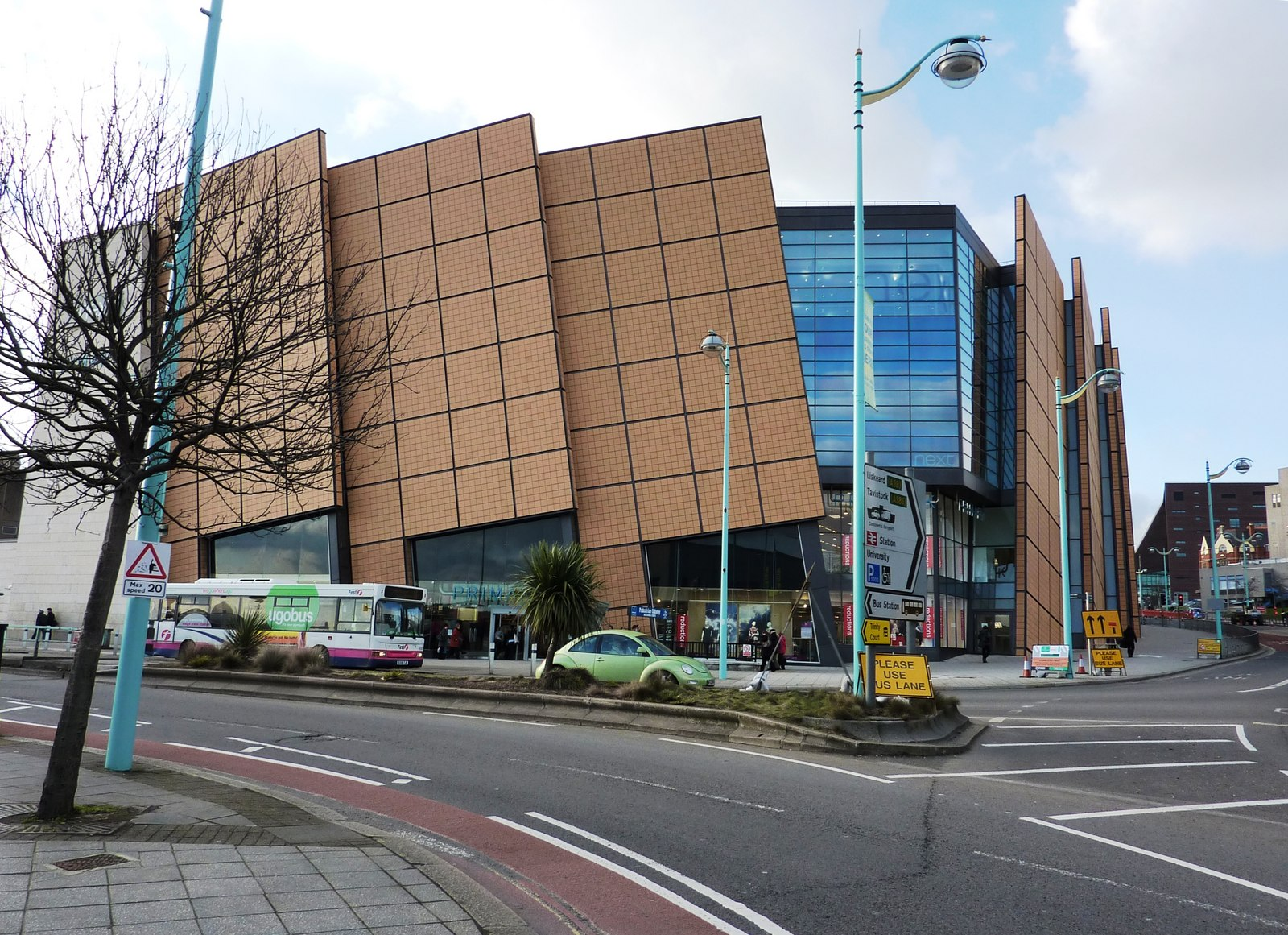
- Location: Plymouth, England
- Coordinates: 50°22′20″N 4°08′15″W
- Address: 1 Charles Street
- Opened: 5 October 2006
- Developer: P&O Estates; Morgan Stanley
- Manager: DTZ
- Owner: British Land
- Architect: Chapman Taylor
- Num. of stores: 66
- Num. of anchor tenants: 8
- Floor area: 425,000 square feet (39,484 m^{2})
- Floors: 3
- Parking: 1270
- Website: drakecircus.com

Drake Circus Shopping Centre is a 425,000-square-foot (39,484 m^{2}) covered shopping mall in the centre of Plymouth, England that opened in October 2006.

The building was designed by London-based architects Chapman Taylor and built by Bovis Lend Lease. Situated behind the ruined Charles Church, preserved as the city's civilian war memorial, the building provoked a mixed reception. Just after it opened, the shopping centre won the inaugural Carbuncle Cup "for crimes against architecture", as the worst new building in the United Kingdom. In 2007, it won two retail industry national awards, one of which was the Retail Week magazine's "Shopping Location of the Year".

== History ==
The term 'circus' as used here refers to an open space, usually circular, where a number of roads meet. Drake Circus was originally a large oval roundabout built in the early 20th century at the junction of four main roads and several minor ones. The roundabout consisted of Edwardian buildings housing shops, and from 1937 its south end carried the "Guinness Clock", which was visible to people travelling up Old Town Street and was a landmark in the city of the time.

The circus survived the Plymouth Blitz of World War II relatively intact, but it was demolished in 1966–7 as part of the Plan for Plymouth, and was replaced by a new open roundabout to the north. Around this time the lower section of the main road to Tavistock off this new roundabout was renamed Drake Circus. A two-level shopping centre with open malls and a large C&A store was built, partly over the site of the original circus. It opened in 1971 and was also named Drake Circus.

Initial proposals to redevelop this mall in the early 1990s failed, but the developers, P&O Estates, tried again in the early 2000s. Plans were drawn up for a much larger centre, and after Allders signed up as the first "anchor" tenant in 2001, work started in February 2004 on demolishing the old centre and the adjoining Charles Street multi-storey car park.

The scheme suffered a setback in January 2005, when Allders went into administration. New tenants Next and Primark committed in 2005 and the building opened in October 2006.

On 3 February 2005, it was announced that the shopping centre had been sold by P&O Estates to Morgan Stanley Real Estate Fund for £55m. On 20 November 2006, it was announced that Kandahar Real Estate had taken a 50 per cent stake in the centre. The centre was bought by British Land for £240 million in January 2011.

In 2007, the centre's management introduced a code of conduct which, like one Bluewater introduced in 2005, banned hooded tops and baseball caps.

Clarke Nicholls Marcel (CNM London) were the civil and structural engineers for the new-build shopping centre.

In 2019, an entertainment complex named The Barcode was opened adjacent to the mall, which is operated by Drake Circus.

== Gallery ==
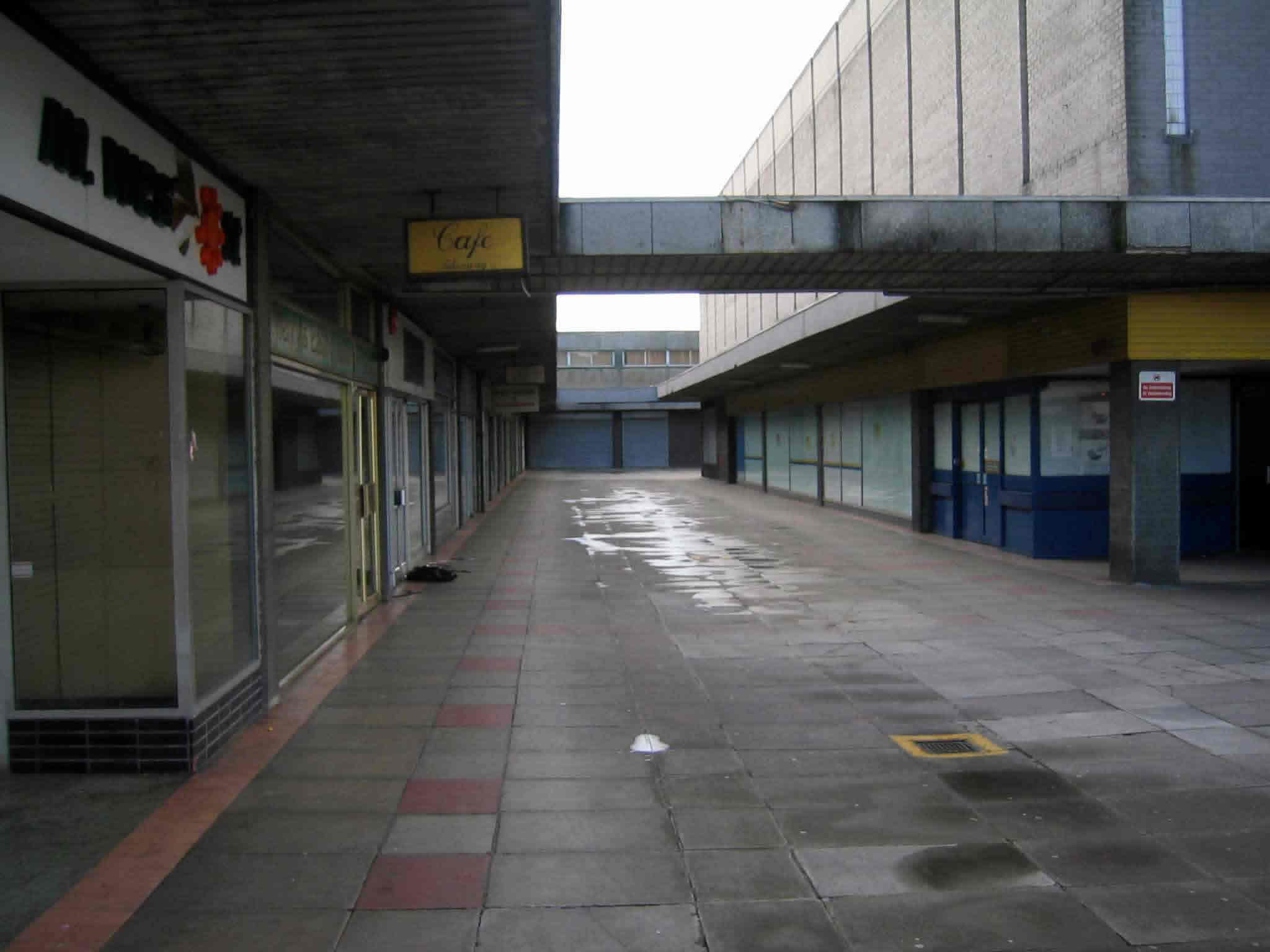
The old Drake Circus shopping mall was demolished in 2004.

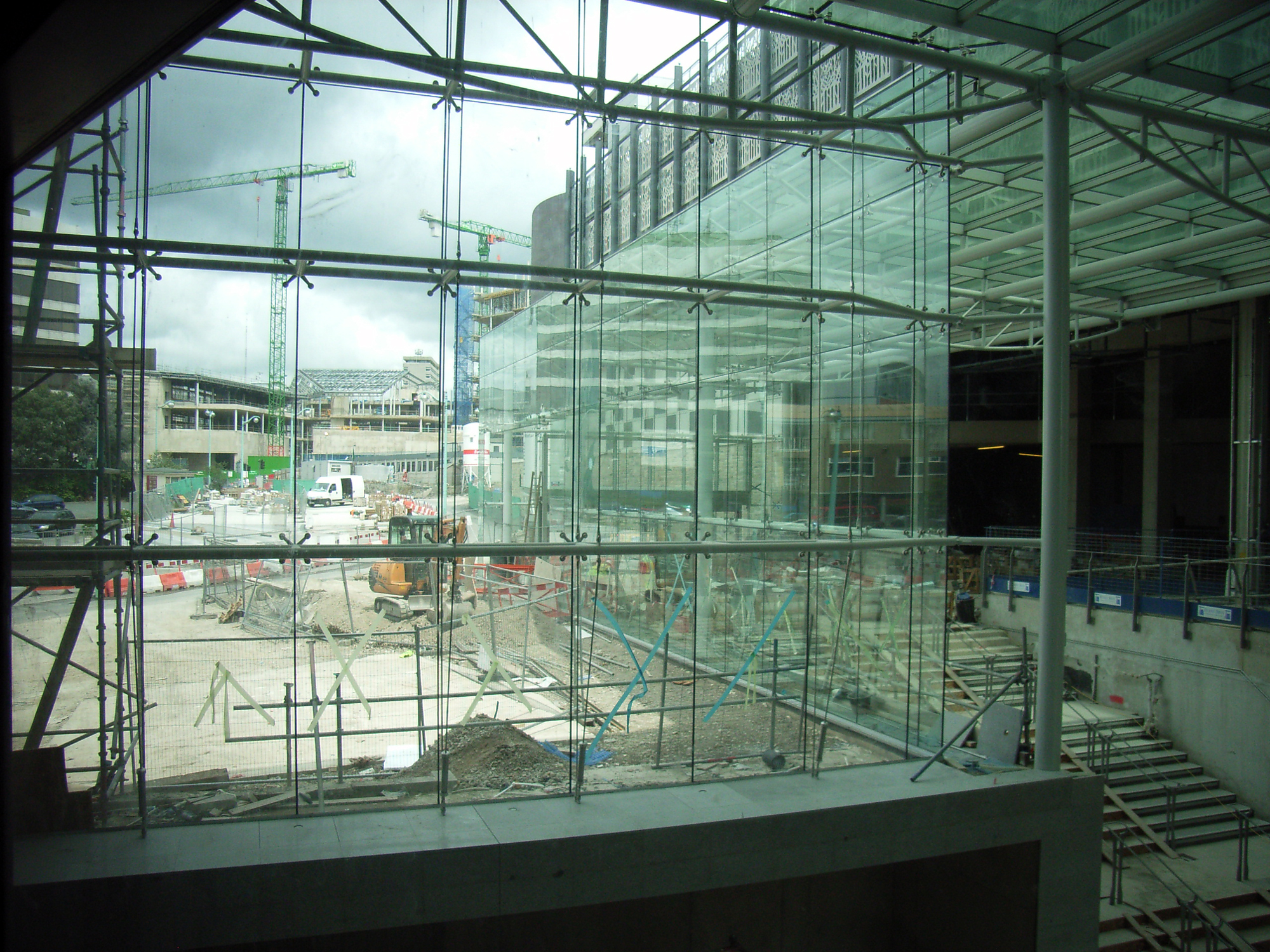
The new centre under construction

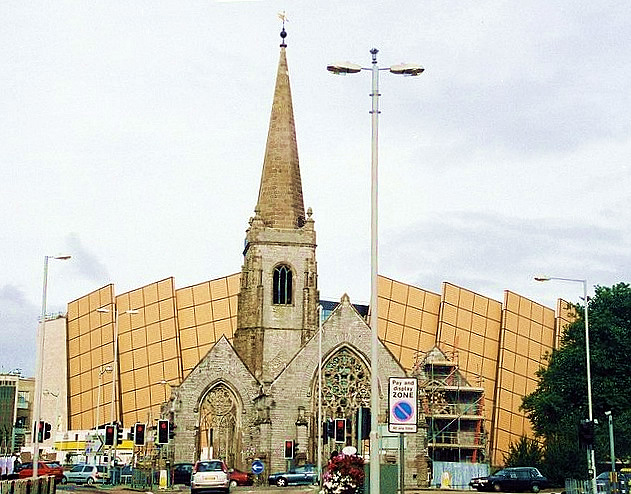
Part of the contentious frontage behind the ruined Charles Church

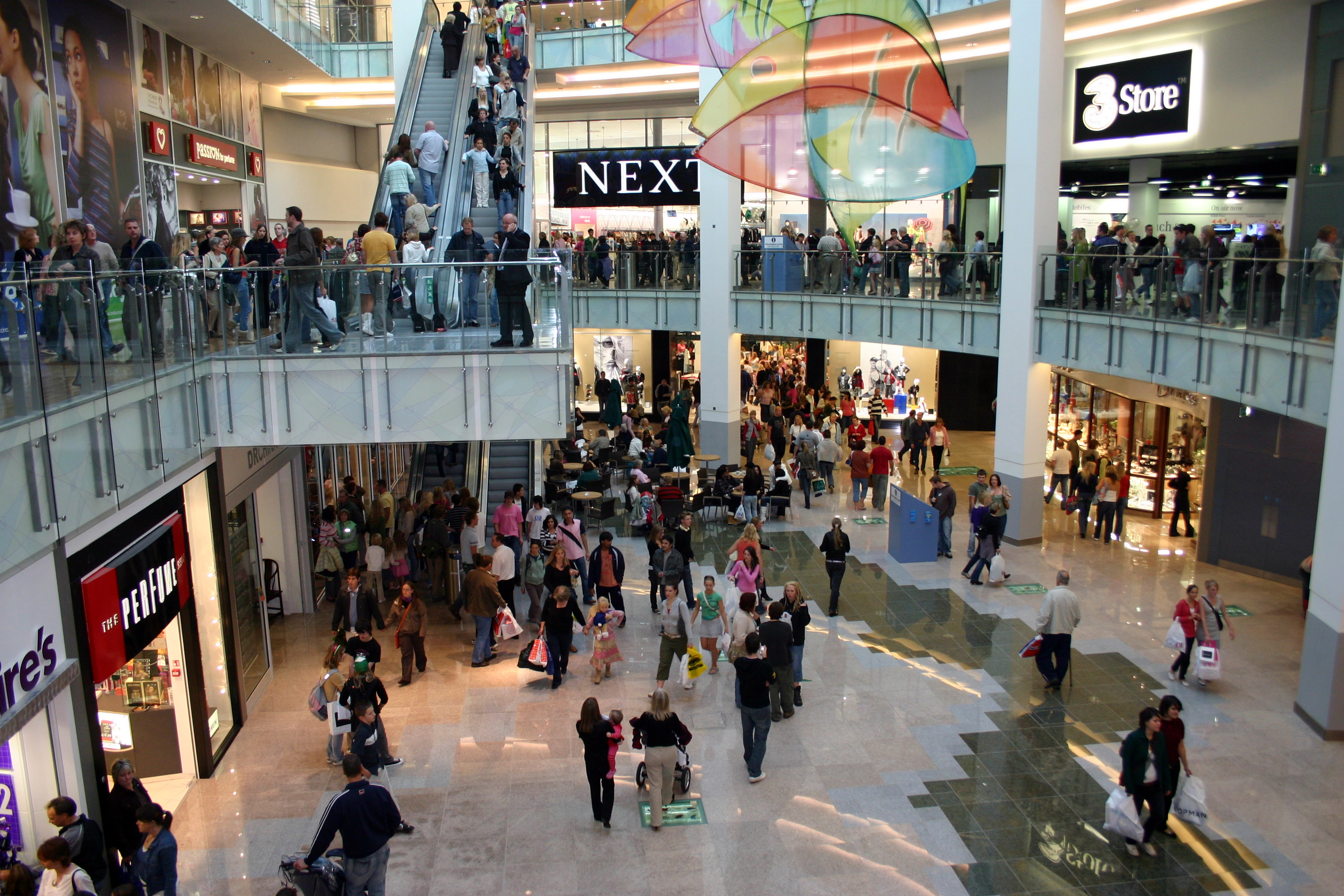
Interior a few days after opening

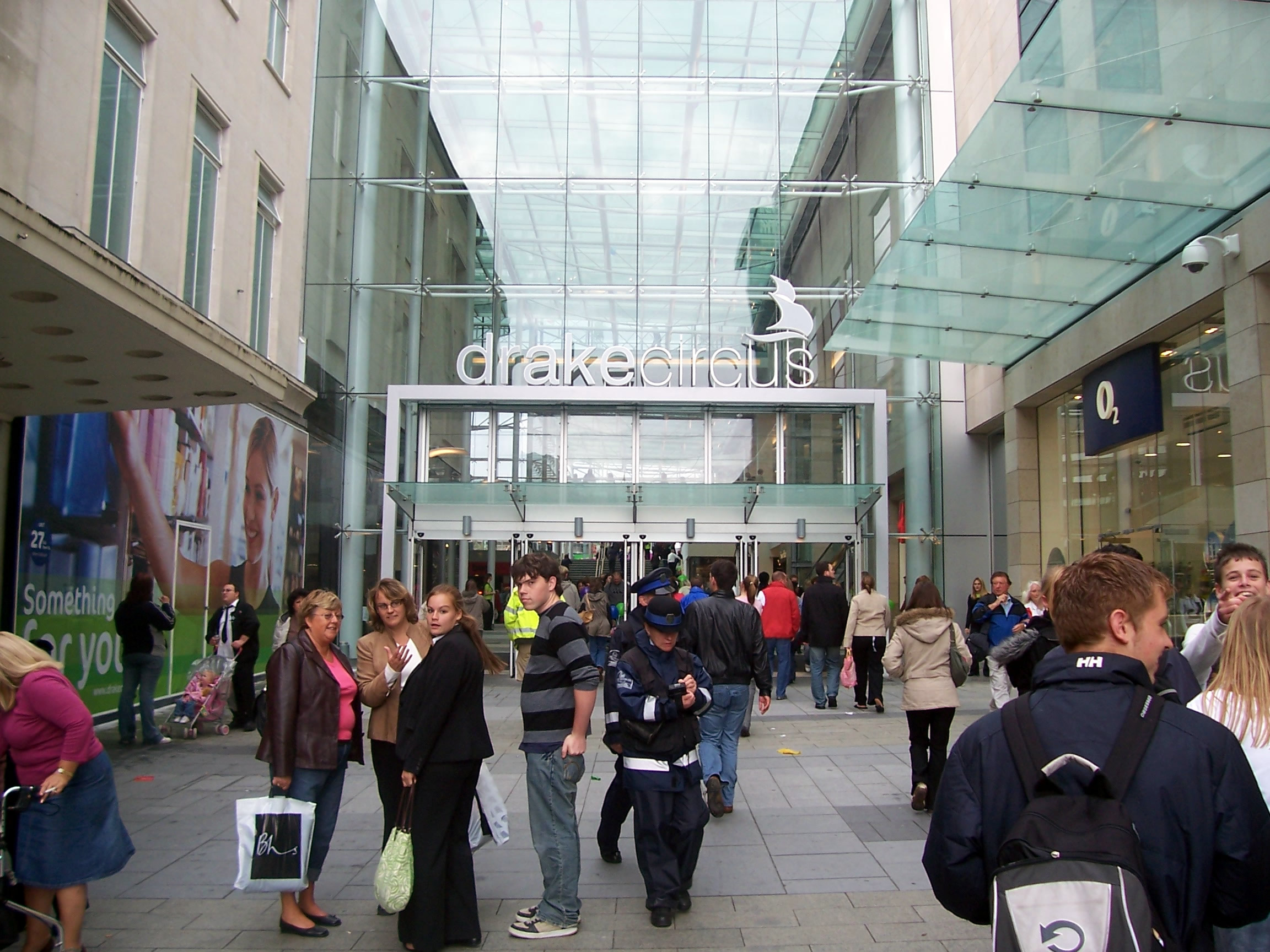
One of the entrances
