= Designer Outlet West Midlands =

- Coordinates: 52.6885°N 02.0143°W
- Address: Eastern Way, Cannock WS11 7JZ, Staffordshire, England
- Opened: April 2021
- Num. of stores: Approx. 63
- Floor area: 26,477 m^{2} (285,000 sq ft)
- Website: www.mcarthurglen.com/en/outlets/uk/designer-outlet-west-midlands/ https://www.mcarthurglen.com/outlets/en/uk/designer-outlet-west-midlands/

The Designer Outlet West Midlands is an outlet shopping centre near Cannock, Staffordshire, England. It is owned by McArhurGlen Group and is the company's 7th designer outlet in the UK. Permission was granted for the construction of the shopping centre in 2016 and work began in 2017. Due to the COVID-19 pandemic, the opening of the centre was delayed from Autumn 2020 to early 2021. The centre officially opened to customers in April 2021.

== Stores ==
The outlet consists of a range of designer brand stores offering clothing, beauty, homeware, gifts, and accessories at discounted prices. In January 2021 the centre was stated to be built and opened in two phases, with the first phase seeing the opening of around 80 stores along with a number of restaurants and cafes, and the second phase - to begin on or shortly after completion of the first - increasing the number of stores to around 130. As of August 2023, there were around 63 stores and 8 restaurants listed on the official website.

== Local concerns ==
After completion of the buildings and car park, a sign measuring 50 ft tall was erected at the centre entrance. Local residents expressed concern at the sign's scale and a councillor at Cannock Chase Council began a petition to have it taken down or reduced in size. McArthurGlen said they have legal permission to keep the sign in place as it was part of their original plans. Concerns were also raised over the centre's name, "Designer Outlet West Midlands", with some locals preferring a reference to Cannock or the county of Staffordshire.

== Transport links ==
The shopping centre is close to Cannock station on the Chase Line with services to Birmingham International, Birmingham New Street, Walsall and Rugeley Trent Valley on the West Coast Main Line as well as occasional services to Wolverhampton.

There are also regular buses which call into the three bus stops within the centre grounds, and two at the side entrance by Mill Farm PH. These run services to Burntwood, Lichfield, Cannock, Great Wyrley, Brownhills, Norton Canes, Walsall and Birmingham. Service X51 (Cannock-Birmingham) is one of the few services which operate in Staffordshire on Sundays. Live departure screens are in situ at each stop for passenger information.
