= Brighton Palace Pier =

Pleasure pier in Brighton, UK

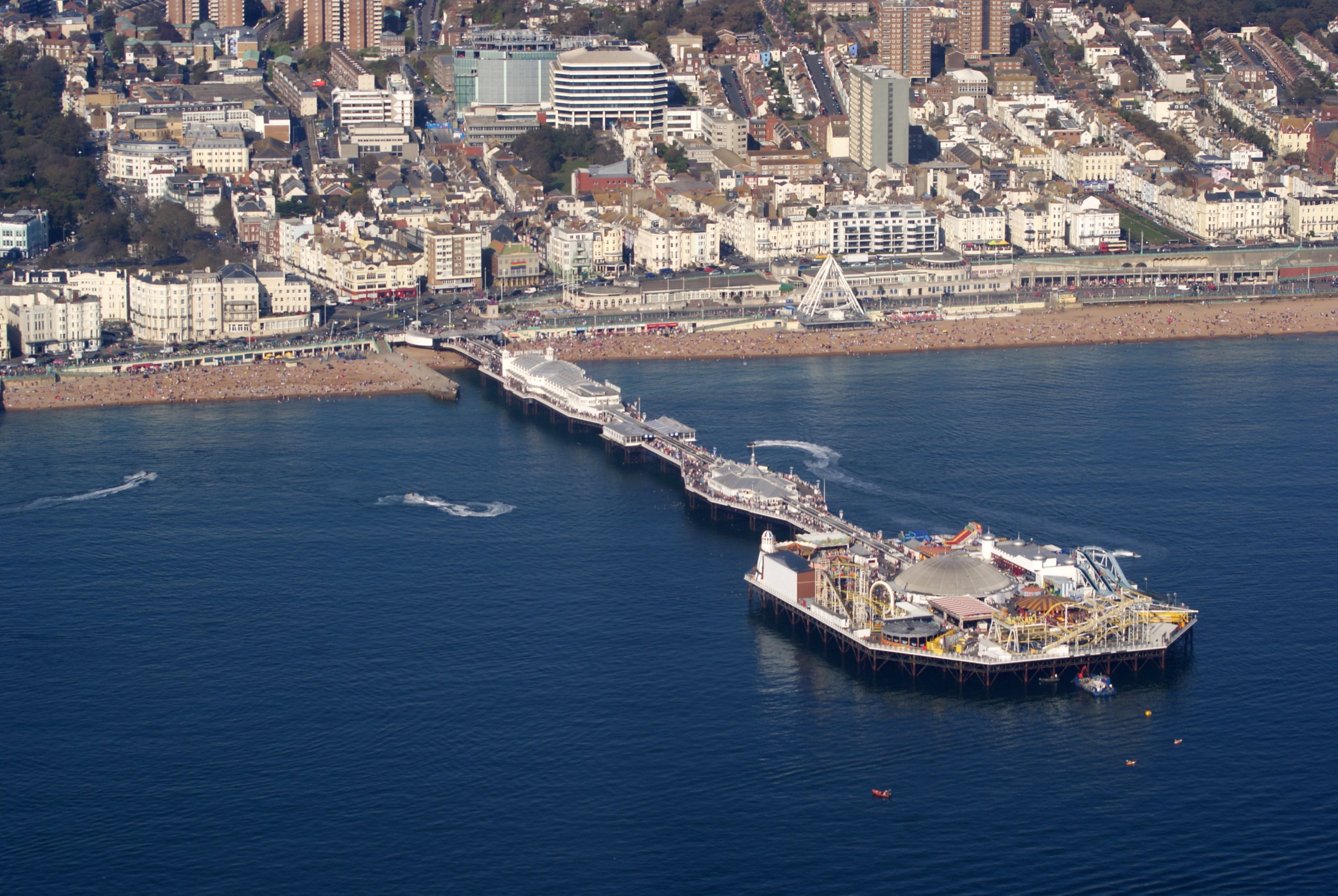
- Brighton Palace Pier in October 2011
- Type: Pleasure Pier
- Coordinates: 50°48′54″N 0°08′13″W
- Official name: Brighton Palace Pier
- Owner: The Brighton Pier Group

Characteristics
- Total length: 1,722 feet (525 m)

History
- Designer: R. St George Moore
- Opening date: 20 May 1899; 127 years ago
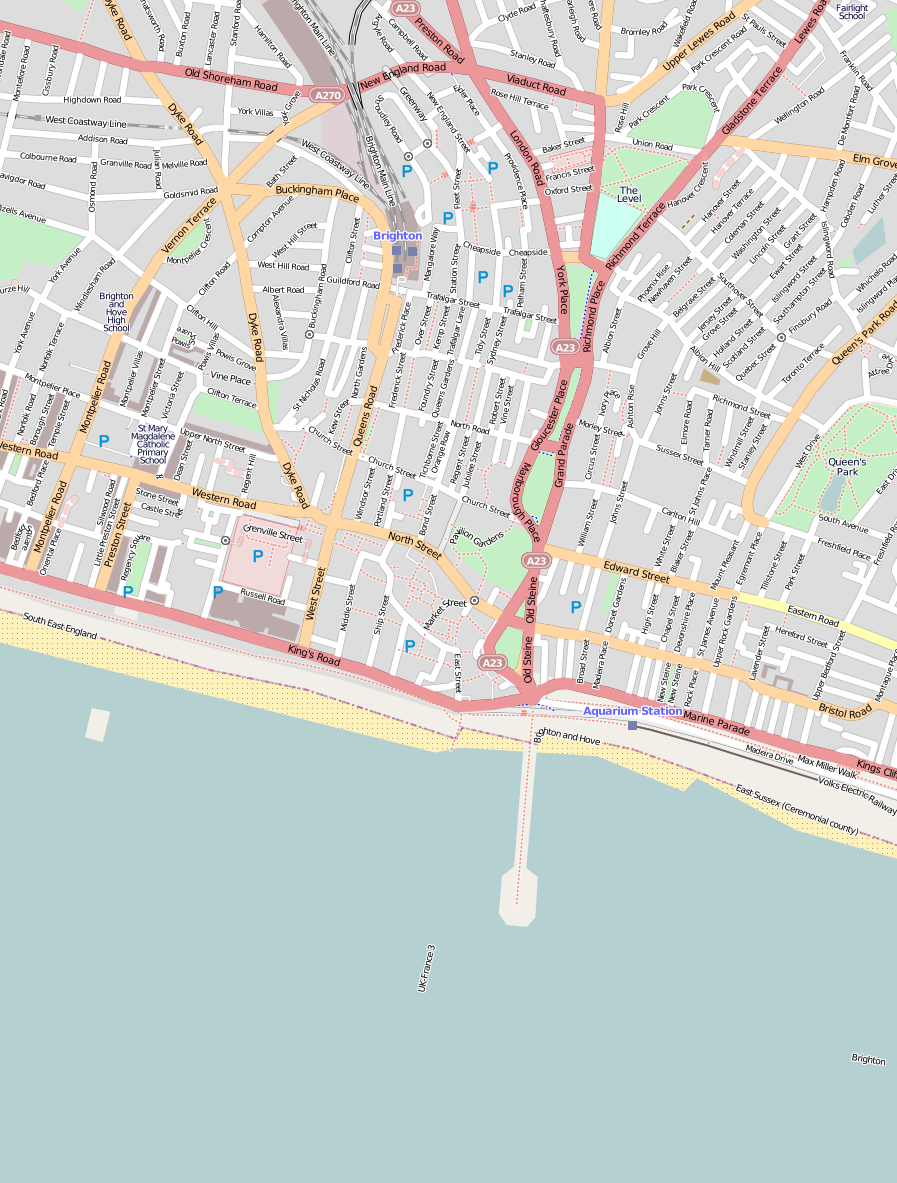
- Location of pier in Brighton www.brightonpier.co.uk

The Brighton Palace Pier, commonly known as Brighton Pier or the Palace Pier, (Note: The official name was Brighton Marine Palace and Pier from opening, but was renamed to simply Brighton Pier in 2000 by the Noble Organisation. In July 2016, the Eclectic Bar Group announced it would be renamed Brighton Palace Pier.) is a Grade II* listed pleasure pier in Brighton, England, located in the city centre opposite the Old Steine. Established in 1899, it was the third pier to be constructed in Brighton after the Royal Suspension Chain Pier and the West Pier, but is now the only one still in operation. It is managed and operated by the Brighton Pier Group.

The Palace Pier was intended as a replacement for the Chain Pier, which collapsed in 1896 during construction of the new pier. It quickly became popular, and had become a frequently-visited theatre and entertainment venue by 1911. Aside from closures owing to war, it continued to hold regular entertainment up to the 1970s. The theatre was damaged in 1973 and following a buy-out was demolished in 1986, changing the pier's character from seaside entertainment to an amusement park, with various fairground rides and roller coasters.

The pier remains popular with the public, with over four million visitors in 2016, and has been featured in many works of British culture, including the gangster thriller Brighton Rock, the comedy Carry On at Your Convenience and the Who's concept album and film Quadrophenia.

== Location ==
The pier entrance is opposite the southern end of Old Steine (the A23 to London) where it meets Marine Parade and Grand Junction Road which run along the seafront. It is 1,722 feet (525 m) long and contains 85 miles (137 km) of planking. Because of the pier's length, repainting it takes three months every year. At night, it is illuminated by 67,000 bulbs.

== History ==
=== 1891–1970 ===
Inaugural Ceremony of Brighton Marine Palace and Pier, 1891

Brighton Marine Palace and Pier Act 1888
- Act of Parliament
- Parliament of the United Kingdom
- Long title: An Act to incorporate and to confer powers upon the Brighton Marine Palace and Pier Company and for other purposes.
- Citation: 51 & 52 Vict. c. clxxii

Dates
- Royal assent: 7 August 1888

Text of statute as originally enacted

Brighton Marine Palace and Pier Act 1893
- Act of Parliament
- Parliament of the United Kingdom
- Long title: An Act to extend the period limited for the construction and completion of the Brighton Marine Palace and Pier and for other purposes.
- Citation: 56 & 57 Vict. c. clv

Dates
- Royal assent: 27 July 1893

Text of statute as originally enacted

Brighton Marine Palace and Pier Act 1899
- Act of Parliament
- Parliament of the United Kingdom
- Long title: An Act to extend the period limited for the construction and completion of the Brighton Marine Palace and Pier and for other purposes.
- Citation: 62 & 63 Vict. c. clxi

Dates
- Royal assent: 1 August 1899

Brighton Marine Palace and Pier Act 1936
- Act of Parliament
- Parliament of the United Kingdom
- Long title: An Act to empower the Brighton Marine Palace and Pier Company to redeem its preference shares and for other purposes.
- Citation: 26 Geo. 5 & 1 Edw. 8. c. xvii

Dates
- Royal assent: 9 April 1936

Text of statute as originally enacted

Brighton Marine Palace and Pier Act 1940
- Act of Parliament
- Parliament of the United Kingdom
- Long title: An Act to amend in certain respects the Brighton Marine Palace and Pier Acts 1888 and 1893 and for other purposes.
- Citation: 3 & 4 Geo. 6. c. xiv

Dates
- Royal assent: 22 May 1940

Text of statute as originally enacted

Pier and Harbour Order (Brighton) Confirmation Act 1952
- Act of Parliament
- Parliament of the United Kingdom
- Long title: An Act to confirm a Provisional Order made by the Minister of Transport under the General Pier and Harbour Act 1861 relating to Brighton.
- Citation: 15 & 16 Geo. 6 & 1 Eliz. 2. c. xxiv

Dates
- Royal assent: 1 August 1952

Other legislation
- Relates to: General Pier and Harbour Act 1861

Text of statute as originally enacted

Brighton Marine Palace and Pier Act 1987
- Act of Parliament
- Parliament of the United Kingdom
- Long title: An Act to authorise the Brighton Marine Palace and Pier Company to construct works and to confer further powers on the Company; and for other purposes.
- Citation: 1987 c. vi

Dates
- Royal assent: 2 March 1987

Text of statute as originally enacted

Brighton Marine Palace and Pier Act 1991
- Act of Parliament
- Parliament of the United Kingdom
- Long title: An Act to authorise the Brighton Marine Palace and Pier Company to construct works; and for other purposes.
- Citation: 1991 c. xv

Dates
- Royal assent: 25 July 1991

Text of statute as originally enacted

The Brighton Marine Palace and Pier Company was incorporated by the Brighton Marine Palace and Pier Act 1888 (51 & 52 Vict. c. clxxii). The pier was designed and constructed by R. St George Moore. It was the third in Brighton, following the Royal Suspension Chain Pier in 1823 and the West Pier in 1866. The inaugural ceremony for laying of the first pile was held on 7 November 1891, overseen by Mayor Samuel Henry Soper. A condition to be met by its builders, in exchange for permission to build, was that the Chain Pier was to be bought and demolished, as it had fallen into a state of disrepair. In 1896, a storm destroyed the remains of the Chain Pier, which narrowly avoided colliding with the new pier during its collapse. Some of its remaining parts, including the toll houses, were re-used for the new pier. A tram along the pier was in operation during construction, but it was dismantled two years after opening.

Work was mostly completed in 1899 and the pier was officially opened on 20 May by the Mayoress of Brighton. It was named the Brighton Marine Palace and Pier, whose name was inscribed into the pier's metalwork. It cost a record £27,000 (£3,000,000 in 2025) to build, including 3,000 lights to illuminate the pier. Part of the cost was repairs to the West Pier and the nearby Volk's Electric Railway caused by damage in the 1896 storm from the Chain Pier's debris. The pier was not fully complete on the opening date; some work on the pavilion was completed shortly afterwards. It was designed to resemble kursaals, which were entertainment buildings found near spas on the Continent, and included reading and dining rooms.

The pier was an immediate success and quickly became one of the most popular landmarks in Brighton. By 1911, the reading rooms had been converted into a theatre. Both Stan Laurel and Charlie Chaplin performed at the pier to hone their comic skills early in their career, before migrating to the US and finding major commercial success in Hollywood. During World War I, the sea surrounding the pier was extensively mined to prevent enemy attacks. In the 1920s, the pier was widened under the authority of the Brighton Marine Palace and Pier Order 1914, and a distinctive clock tower was added.

During World War II, the pier was closed as a security precaution. A section of decking was removed in order to prevent access from an enemy landing. The pier regained its popularity after the war, and continued to run regular summer shows, including Tommy Trinder, Doris and Elsie Waters and Dick Emery.

=== 1970–2000 ===
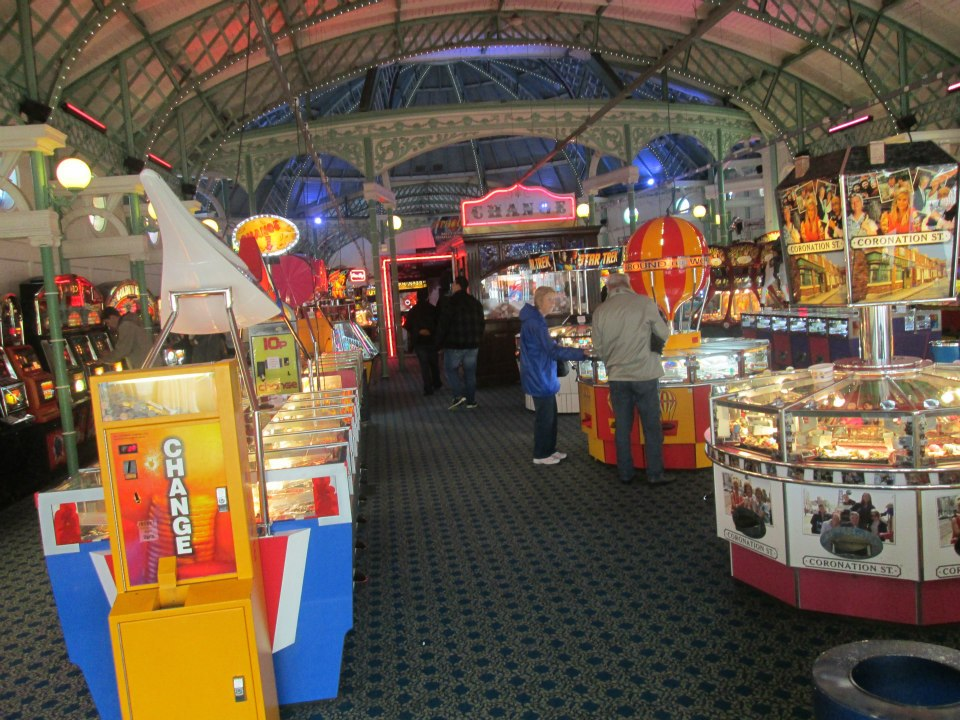
Brighton Pier arcade

The pier was listed at Grade II* on 20 August 1971. As of February 2001, it was one of 70 Grade II*-listed buildings and structures, and 1,218 listed buildings of all grades, in the city of Brighton and Hove.

During a storm in 1973, a 70-long-ton (71 t) barge moored at the pier's landing stage broke loose and began to damage the pier head, particularly the theatre. Despite fears that the pier would be destroyed, the storm eased and the barge was removed. The landing pier was demolished in 1975, and the damaged theatre was never used again, despite protests from the Theatres Trust.

The pier was sold to the Noble Organisation in 1984. The theatre was removed two years later, on the understanding that it would be replaced; however a domed amusement arcade was put in place instead. Consequently, the seaward end of the pier was filled with fairground rides, including thrill rides, children's rides and roller coasters. Entertainment continued to be popular at the pier; the Spice Girls made an early live performance there in 1996 and returned the following year after achieving commercial success.

On 13 August 1994, a bomb planted by the IRA near the pier was defused by a controlled explosion. A similar bomb by the same perpetrators had exploded in Bognor Regis on the same day. The bombing was intended to mark the 25th anniversary of the start of The Troubles. The pier was closed for several days owing to police investigation.

=== 2000–present ===
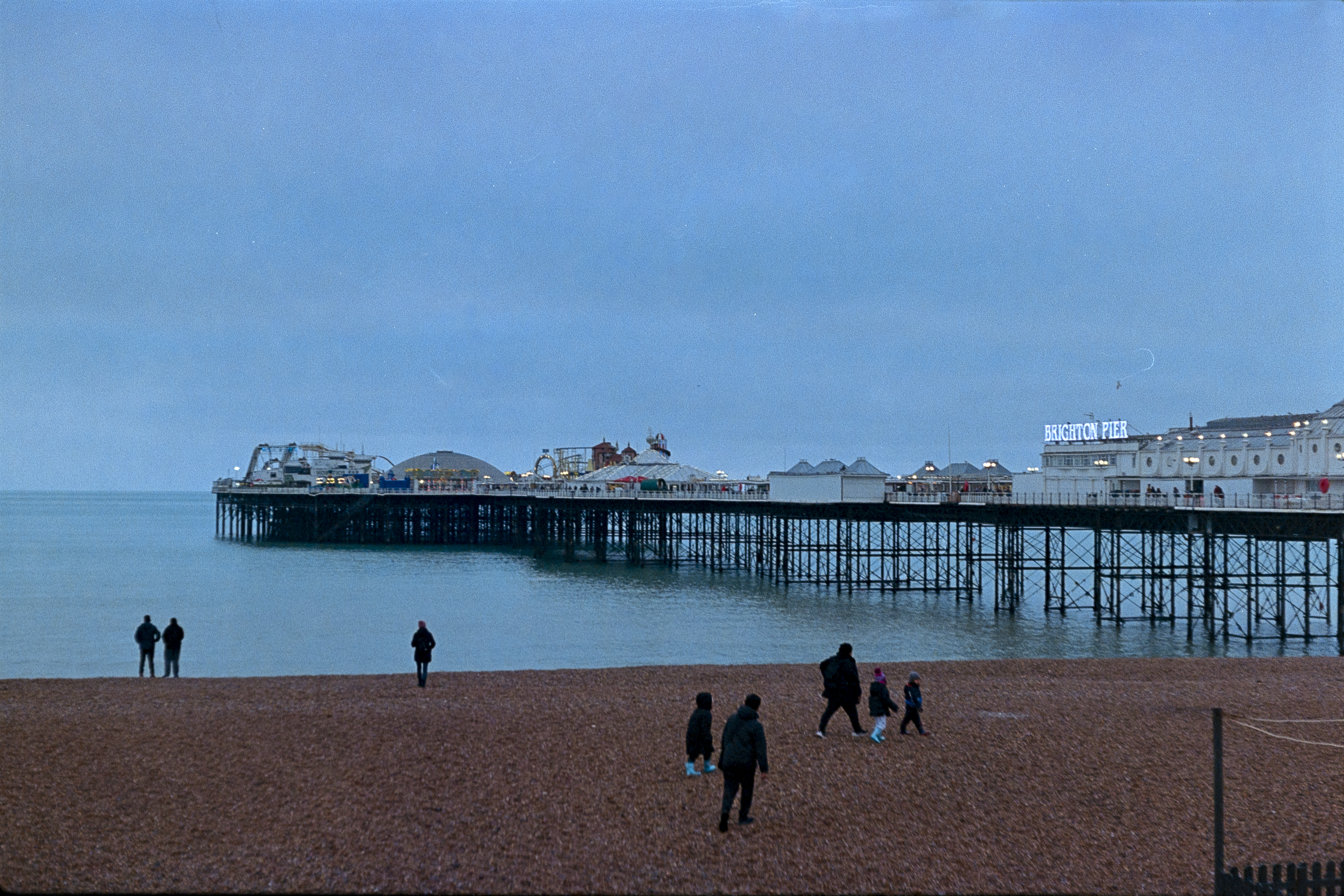
The pier in December 2024

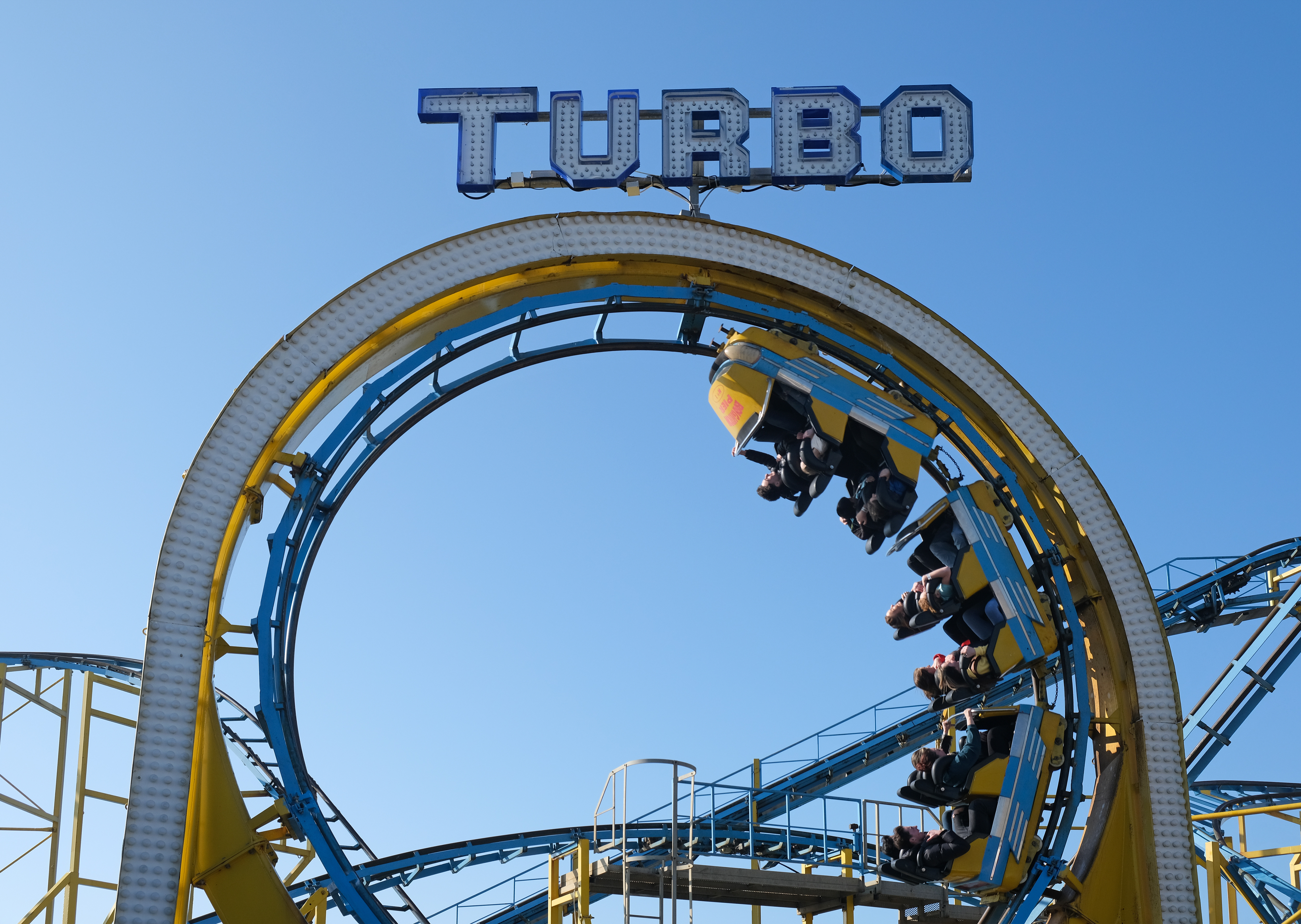
The Turbo roller coaster at the end of Brighton Palace Pier

The pier was renamed as "Brighton Pier" in 2000, although this legal change was not recognised by the National Piers Society nor some residents of Brighton and Hove. The local newspaper, The Argus, continued to refer to the structure as the Palace Pier.

The Palace Pier caught fire on the evening of 4 February 2003, most of it reopening the following day with police suspecting arson. The fire destroyed the ghost train ride, which is where the fire started, as well as damaging two other rides and leaving a hole in the pier's decking, but luckily not causing any structural damage.

In 2004, the Brighton Marine Palace Pier Company (owned by the Noble Organisation), admitted an offence of breaching public safety under the Health and Safety at Work etc. Act 1974 and had to pay fines and costs of £37,000 after a fairground ride was operated with part of its track missing. A representative from the Health and Safety Executive said that inadequate procedures were to blame for the fact that nothing had been done to alert staff or passengers that the ride would be dangerous to use. The pier management came into criticism from Brighton and Hove City Council, who thought they were relying too much on fairground rides, some of which were being built too high.

In 2011, the Noble Organisation put the pier for sale, with an expected price of £30 million. It was rumoured that the council wanted to buy the pier, but this was quickly ruled out. It was taken off the market the following year, due to lack of interest in suitable buyers. In 2016, it was sold to the Eclectic Bar Group, headed by former PizzaExpress owner Luke Johnson, who renamed the pier back to Brighton Palace Pier in July.

The Palace Pier remains a popular tourist attraction into the 21st century, particularly with day visitors to the city. In contrast to the redevelopment and liberal culture in Brighton generally, it has retained a traditional down-market "bucket and spade" seaside atmosphere. In 2016, the Brighton Fringe festival director Julian Caddy criticised the pier as "a massive public relations problem".

On 8 April 2019 a piece of the Air Race ride, manufactured by Zamperla, came loose and hit some people, injuring four people, one of whom was taken to hospital.

In 2024 it was announced that the pier would introduce a £1 admission fee beginning on 25 May. The fee was in place over weekends during June and throughout July and August and did not apply to local residents who have a Brighton Palace Pier local residents card. The fee has since been increased to £2, chargeable from March to September, still with free access for local residents. In January 2026, it was reported that the pier had been put up for sale by its owners, due to reduced revenue and increasing costs.

== Rides ==
The pier includes several fairground rides, such as two roller coasters, a haunted house ride, a traditional carousel, a helter skelter and a cup and saucer ride. The Booster was a pendulum ride by Fabbri, which catapulted people 130 feet (40 m) into the air, turning upside down in the process. It closed in 2023 for refurbishment.

For young children, Fantasia is a simple ride featuring Disney characters.

== Cultural references ==
The pier has featured regularly in British popular culture. It is shown prominently in the 1971 film, Carry on at Your Convenience, and it is shown to represent Brighton in several film and television features, including MirrorMask, The Persuaders, the Doctor Who serial The Leisure Hive (1980), the 1986 film Mona Lisa, and the 2007 film, Sweeney Todd: The Demon Barber of Fleet Street.

The Graham Greene novel Brighton Rock featured the Palace Pier. John Boulting's 1947 film adaptation helped established "low life" subculture in Brighton, and the climax of the film is set on it, where gangleader Pinkie Brown (played by Richard Attenborough) falls to his death. The 1953 B movie Girl on a Pier is set around the Palace Pier and also features the clash between holidaymakers and gangsters in Brighton. The Who's 1973 concept album Quadrophenia was inspired in part by band leader Pete Townshend spending a night underneath the pier in March 1964. It is a pivotal part of the album's plot, and features in the 1979 film. Townshend later said that the rest of the band understood this element of the story, as it related to their mod roots.

The 2014 novel The Bone Clocks by David Mitchell includes passages that take place on the pier. The 2015 British TV series, Cuffs, which takes place in Brighton features the pier, both in the opening theme as well as in parts of the story lines. Graham Swift's 2020 novel Here We Are, focuses on a trio of entertainers performing at the pier in the immediate postwar period.

In 2015, Martyn Ware, founding member of pop group the Human League, made a series of field recordings on the pier as part of a project with the National Trust and British Library project to capture the sounds of Britain.

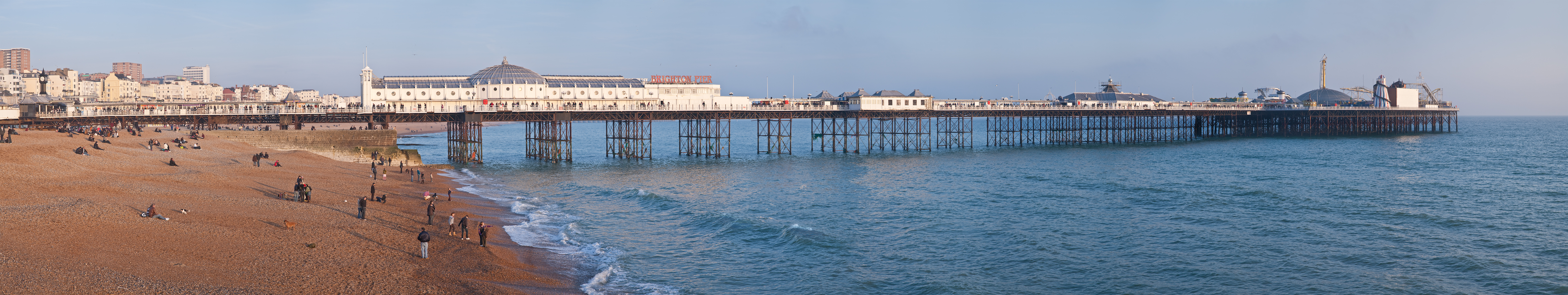
The Brighton Marine Palace and Pier and Brighton Beach as viewed from the west

== Accolades ==
The pier was awarded the National Piers Society's Pier of the Year award in 1998. In 2017, it was listed as the fourth most popular free attraction in Britain in a National Express survey.

In 2017, the pier was said to be the United Kingdom's most visited tourist attraction outside London, with over 4.5 million visitors the previous year.

== See also ==
- Grade II* listed buildings in Brighton and Hove
- List of piers in the United Kingdom

Awards and achievements
Preceded by Eastbourne Pier	National Piers Society; Pier of the Year; 1998	Succeeded by Clevedon Pier
