= Warner Village Cinemas =

Defunct chain of multiplex cinemas in the United Kingdom

- Formerly: Warner Bros. Cinemas
- Industry: Entertainment
- Founded: Late 1980s
- Defunct: October 2009
- Fate: UK operations folded into Vue Cinemas; Taiwan operations folded into Vieshow Cinemas
- Parent: Warner Bros.

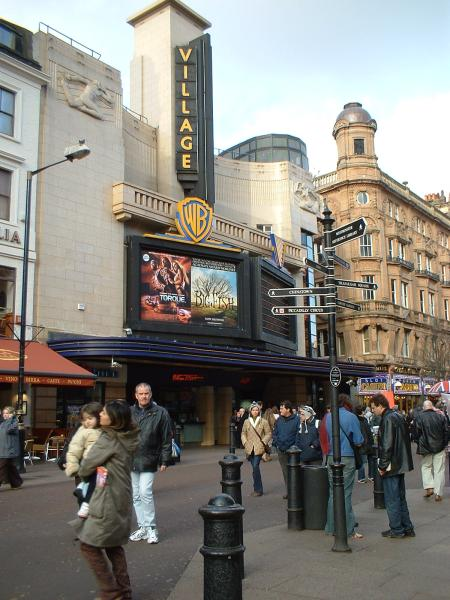
Leicester Square (before rebranding as Vue)

Warner Village Cinemas was a chain of multiplex cinemas operated by Warner Bros. in the various locations throughout Europe. Created in the late 1980s in the UK as Warner Bros. Cinemas, these locations acted as a rival to Paramount and Universal's UCI Cinemas chain. This Warner brand of theatre debuted as the multiplex theatre format location was beginning to replace the traditional in-town style of cinema in the UK. In November 1996, a joint venture between Warner Bros. International Theatres and Village Roadshow Australia was established where the locations would start to share the prospective company names, leading to the title "Warner Village". The chain expanded by building more sites from 1997 to November 2002, with 40 sites open. The Warner Village chain is considered a continuation of the former UK cinema chain Warner Cinemas, which had operated for many decades prior to the formation.

== United Kingdom ==
Its first in the UK was in Bury, Greater Manchester. The grand opening was in June 1989, the opening film was Police Academy 6: City Under Siege with stars of the film flown over for the event, in which Bruce Willis was also at the event with Liza Minnelli cutting the opening ribbon. The chain had 36 cinemas with 354 screens including the flagship in Leicester Square when it was purchased by SBC International Cinemas in May 2003. SBC rebranded all the cinemas as Vue Cinemas starting in March 2004, including the refurbishment of the foyers, the lighting and replacing screen numbers in some cinemas. During the transition, some Warner Village locations retained the branding until early 2006 as some certain cinemas were owned and operated solely by Village Roadshow Australia.

=== Warner West End ===
The flagship and arguably most notable Warner Village Cinema was the Warner West End in Leicester Square, London, a multiplex that used to host Warner film premieres. This theatre features two bas-relief sculptures, Sight and Sound, sculpted by Edward Bainbridge Copnall. This location had a history way back to the early days of motion pictures, with it being an original Warner Theatre from the early 20th Century. A notable event for this location was the 1993 premiere of the film The Fugitive, this was a reopening of the location after a lengthy renovation to bring the location in line with the design of the 'Warner Cinemas' multiplex chain. The star of The Fugitive, Harrison Ford, attended to place a time capsule to commemorate the event. In 2003, during the Vue rebrand, this location became Vue West End. The interior formed in the 1993 reopening (aside from Warner logos) was maintained up until 2017, when Vue performed an overhaul renovation to the location to update the tired design and renew interest.

== Other territories ==
The cinema chain also operated in Taiwan, opening a cinema in a shopping mall named Warner Village Cinema Centre in Taipei. In 2005 it was bought out and renamed Vieshow Cinemas.

In October 2009, the Italian franchise of Warner Village was bought by the Benetton Group and merged with Mediaset's Medusa Multicinema to create The Space Cinema. It was originally a joint venture between Warner Bros. International Theatres, Village Roadshow Australia and Focus Srl., the local Italian partner. This was the last surviving branch of the Warner Village Cinemas franchise.

== Sponsorship ==
From March 2, 2001, until December 2003, Warner Village Cinemas was the sponsor of ITV LWT's weather forecasts (or simply London Weekend Weather / London Weather at the Weekend as from November 1, 2002), as well as being advertised on some British Warner Home Video releases. On the 2002 video game The Getaway, Warner Village was promoted through advertising billboards which could be found on London Taxis throughout the game.
