= The Centre (Livingston) =

Shopping centre in Livingston, Scotland

Coordinates: 55°53′02″N 3°30′51″W

The Centre is the name of a shopping centre in Livingston, Scotland. Formerly known as 'Livingston Regional Centre' before becoming the more widely recognised 'Almondvale Shopping Centre' and then to its current name.

It lies opposite the Livingston Designer Outlet, Scotland's largest outlet mall. This makes the combined complex one of the UK's largest shopping districts with a combined 1.29 million square ft of retail space.

== Origins ==
The original centre was built in the 1970s by the now defunct Livingston Development Corporation (LDC) and was home to smaller independent retailers, such as Virgo, a fashion store, and Coda Music, as well as well known brand names such as WoolCo (which became the now-defunct Woolworths) and FineFare (the equally defunct Gateway). The shopping centre was dark and gave the appearance of an outside mall, except that it was roofed.

Through time modernizations were made to make it more appealing to shoppers and more upmarket, bringing in more up-to-date floor tiling, bright lighting and the centres' branding and logos on the walls.

== Phase Two ==
It was decided that a second phase would be built onto the existing frontage of the centre and would incorporate a purpose-built supermarket and feature two twin towers one on the front entrance elevation and the other on the side entrance where the new supermarket would be. Phase two opened in 1995 and had stores such as Iceland, Vodafone and Boots, among others.

== Phase Three ==
The latest extension to the centre came in 2008, A high glass roof was positioned over a widened footpath to create the appearance of an outdoor shopping precinct. This area was codenamed "The Elements", in the sense that it combined outdoor and indoor elements.

The Elements opened in 2008 and is home to stores such as River Island, Next and Marks & Spencer.

== The Zones ==
The Centre is made up of 3 zones:-

- Almondvale Walk (the original 1970s phase one of the shopping centre),
- Almondvale Place (phase two which opened in 1995 and featured the two twin towers at each side of the building)
- Elements Square, the Wintergarden and The Avenue (phase three or The Elements which was opened in 2008).

The Centre is beside Livingston Designer Outlet (formerly McArthur Glen Livingston).

== Anchor stores ==
The Centre contains two anchor stores - Marks & Spencer, Primark - as well as many other smaller retail units, and the new mall - named Elements Square - has a transparent ETFE roof covering its four shopping avenues. There is also an internal civic space known as the Wintergarden.

== Other stores ==
Stores include: Marks & Spencer, HMV, Waterstone's, H&M, Primark, Asda, WHSmith, New Look, and Schuh

== Ownership transfer ==
In December 2014, The Centre's owners Land Securities sold the shopping centre and associated retail parks to an investment firm HSBC Investments marking the end of 30 plus years of ownership by the London-based management firm.

In 2023, it was sold to property group M Core via 2 subsidiaries. The associated retail parks were not sold to M Core, instead being sold to Frasers Group.
