= Vue International =

British multinational cinema company

Vue Entertainment International Limited
- Type: Private
- Founded: 1999; 27 years ago (as Spean Bridge Cinemas); 13 May 2003; 23 years ago (as Vue)
- Founder: Tim Richards CBE (CEO)
- Headquarters: Registered office: St Helier, Jersey; Corporate headquarters: London, England, UK
- Number of locations: 225 (as of 2025)
- Area served: 8 European countries
- Key people: Tim Richards CBE (Founder, CEO); Alison Cornwell (CFO); Katrina Cliffe (Acting Co–chairman); Matt Eyre (COO)
- Owner: The Bickes Capital LTD; Barings LLC; Farallon Capital
- Divisions: CinemaxX; Multikino; The Space Cinema; Vue UK and Ireland; Vue Nederland
- Subsidiaries: Vue Lumière
- Website: www.vue-international.com

Vue International (/vjuː/, like "view") is a multinational cinema holding company headquartered in London, England, and registered in St Helier, Jersey. It operates in the United Kingdom, Ireland and Denmark as Vue, with international operations in Germany (as CinemaxX); Italy (as The Space Cinema); Poland and Lithuania (Multikino); and Netherlands (Vue Netherlands).

== History ==
=== Foundation ===
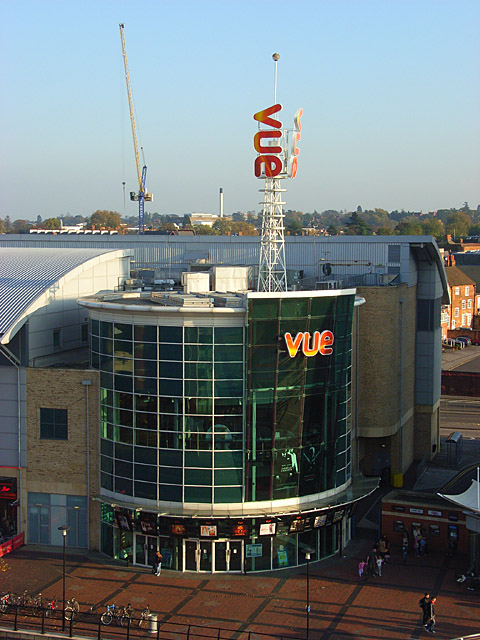
Vue at The Oracle in Reading, England

The company was founded in 1999 as Spean Bridge Cinemas by Stewart Blair, a former executive of United Artists Theatres and Tim Richards, a former executive of Warner Bros. International Theatres. It was named after a holiday to the Scottish Highland village of the same name by Blair.

=== 2000s ===
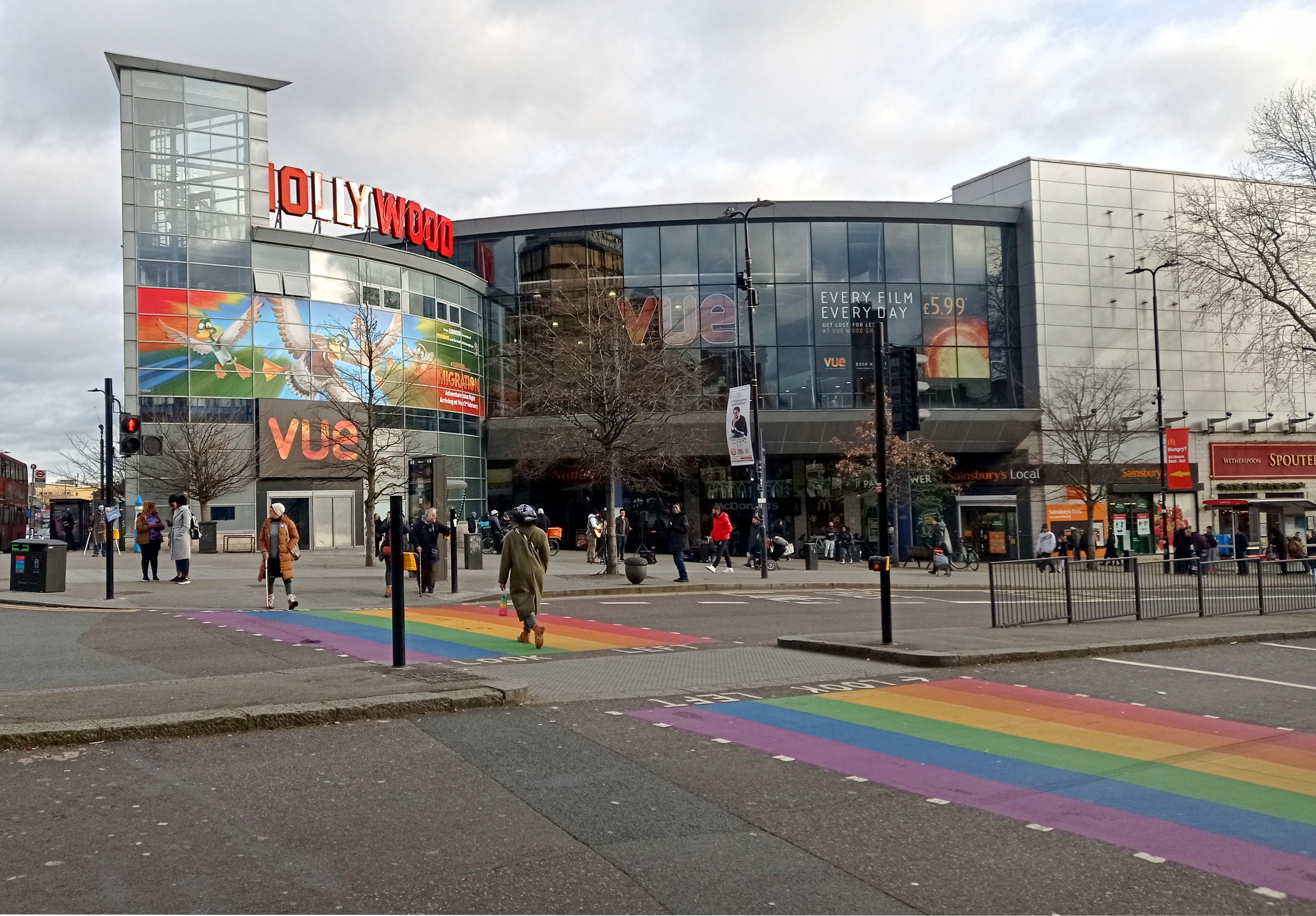
Vue Cinema, Wood Green, London

The first cinema Spean Bridge opened was under The Circuit Cinema brand at Livingston Designer Outlet in Livingston, Scotland, on 5 October 2000. The company was later renamed as SBC International Cinemas and opened cinemas in Faro, Portugal (closed in 2014) and Taipei, Taiwan (still operating as SBC).

In May 2003, SBC bought Warner Village Cinemas from its owners, Village Roadshow and Warner Bros., for £250 million and changed its name to Vue. At the time, SBC owned four cinemas, and Warner Village Cinemas owned 36. In April 2005, the chain acquired the Ster Century chain from Aurora Entertainment. According to Vue, this included the highest grossing cinema in the United Kingdom or Ireland at Liffey Valley Shopping Centre in Dublin, Ireland.

On 20 June 2006, Vue's executive team completed a management buyout of the company with the backing of Bank of Scotland Corporate; the management team retaining a 51% stake. Also, as part of the buyout, Vue took full ownership of the four Village sites it had been operating under contract from Village Roadshow. The private equity firm Doughty Hanson & Co acquired Vue in November 2010.

=== 2010s ===
Vue bought the company, Apollo, in May 2012, retaining 14 new sites across the United Kingdom, making it the third largest cinema company in the United Kingdom, behind Odeon and Cineworld.

In May 2013, Vue Entertainment acquired Multikino, the Polish cinema operator owning thirty cinemas with almost 250 screens in Poland and Baltic countries.

In June 2013, Doughty Hanson & Co announced it had sold Vue to the Canadian pension funds Alberta Investment Management Corporation and OMERS for £935 million.

In November 2014, Vue International acquired The Space Cinema in Italy.

In March 2015, Vue announced it would build the United Kingdom's first eSports arena in cooperation with Gfinity, costing £350,000. The Fulham Broadway cinema was converted into a six hundred seat 'Gfinity Arena,' to host e gaming events.

In August 2015, Vue International acquired JT Bioscopen, the second-largest cinema chain in the Netherlands, bringing Vue's number of sites to over 200.

In June 2018, Vue acquired the Irish operator Showtime Cinemas, adding a further two cinemas to their estate in the United Kingdom and Ireland, now totalling 89 cinemas.

=== 2020–present ===
In March 2020, Vue temporarily closed its cinemas due to the COVID-19 pandemic, stating that it would "remain closed until further notice". Though numerous lockdowns affected a brief reopening in mid-2020, eventually, all cinemas reopened in May 2021, with COVID restrictions in force until spring 2022.

On 18 May 2020, Vue announced that it would close its single Multikino site in Riga, Latvia, after operating for almost 10 years.

In January 2023, Vue International Group completed a restructuring which resulted in a change in the consolidating entity from Vue International Bidco plc (a UK incorporated company) to Vue Entertainment International Limited (a Jersey incorporated company).

In January 2024, the company concluded the sale of its SBC operations in Taiwan, resulting in a reduction of 1 cinema site.

== Locations ==
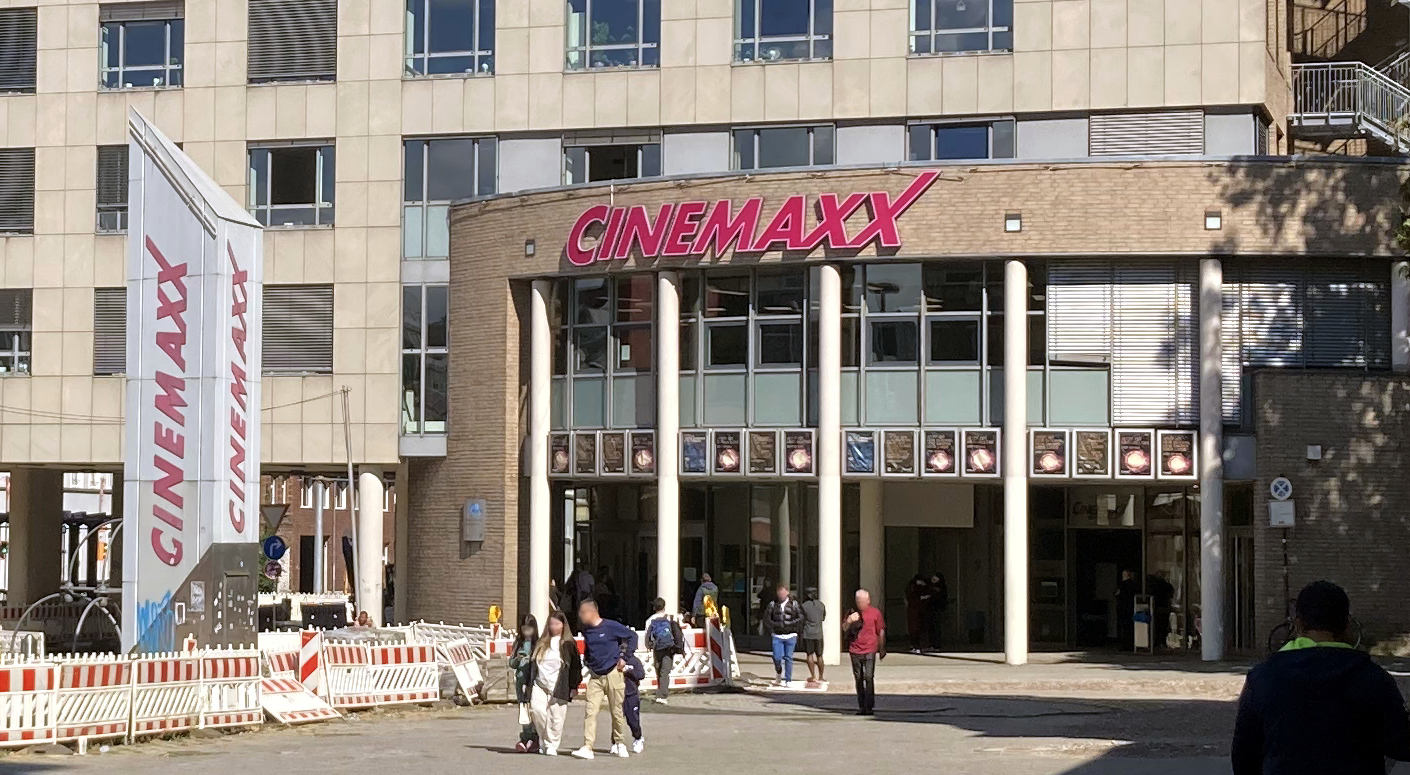
CinemaxX in Krefeld

Vue International operates 225 sites and almost 2,000 screens across 8 countries.

Country	Operating brand	No. of cinemas	No. of screens
United Kingdom and Ireland	Vue UK & Ireland	92	876
Germany	CinemaxX	30	257
Denmark	Vue Danmark	3	33
Italy	The Space Cinema	35	349
Poland and Lithuania	Multikino	45	320
Netherlands	Vue Nederland	20	133
