= Leisure industry =

Sector of the economy dealing with recreation and tourism

The leisure industry is the segment of business focused on provision of goods and services related to recreation, entertainment, sports, and tourism (REST)-related products and services.

The field has developed to the point of having university degrees and disciplines focused on it, such as the Cornell University School of Hotel Administration, Webber, and San Jose State University's departments of hospitality, recreation and tourism management. Some universities offer leisure degrees, two of those universities can be found in the Netherlands: the Breda University of Applied Sciences and the NHLStenden University of Applied Sciences. Both offers bachelor's in international leisure management, the latter of which is branded as International Leisure & Events Management.

== See also ==
- Gambling
- Sport industry
