= Livingston Designer Outlet =

Coordinates: 55.88324°N 3.5198°W

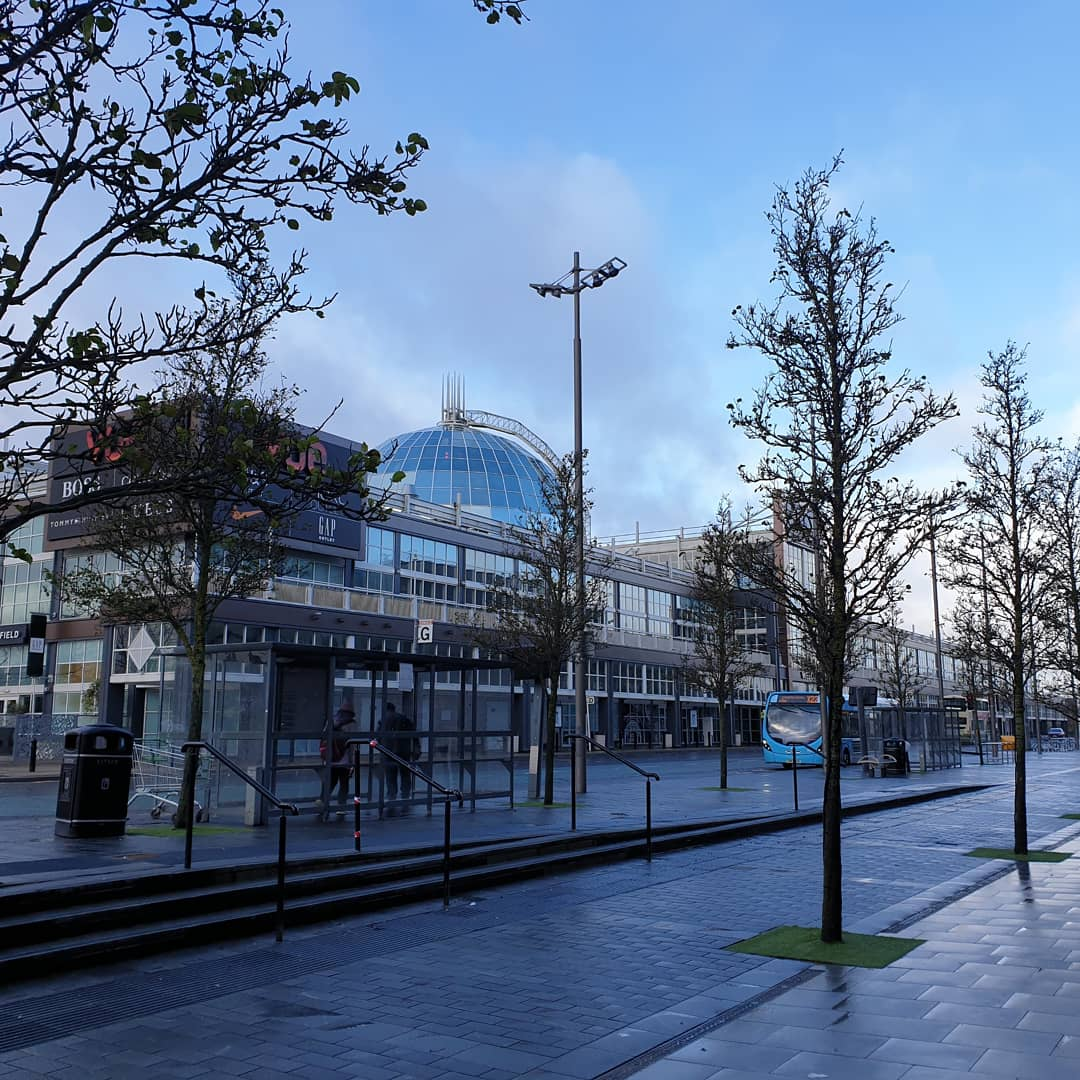
- Livingston Designer Outlet seen from Almondvale Avenue
- Location: Livingston, West Lothian, Scotland, United Kingdom
- Address: Almondvale Avenue, Livingston, West Lothian, EH54 6QX
- Opened: October 2000
- Manager: Savills Property Management
- Owner: Patron and Global Mutual
- Architect: Don Hisaka
- Num. of stores: >70
- Website: https://livingston-designer-outlet.co.uk/

Livingston Designer Outlet is the largest outlet mall in Scotland, and opened in October 2000 under the ownership of McArthurGlen as McArthurGlen Livingston Designer Outlet and sits opposite the popular The Centre (Livingston) shopping centre. The glass roof reminiscent of the Crystal Palace was designed by an architect called Don Hisaka.

In August 2013 the complex was renamed to 'Livingston Designer Outlet' as the site was sold to LaSalle Investment Management. In 2017 the complex was once again sold, this time to Blackstone. Shortly after in 2018, the centre underwent a huge makeover in which the company invested several million pounds in order to appeal to a higher end market.

== Stores ==
The outlet has around 100 stores which include: Adidas, Clarks Outlet, Calvin Klein (fashion house), Tommy Hilfiger (company), Lindt Chocolate Store, Next Clearance, Nike, Ted Baker, Skechers, Marks & Spencer Outlet, Crocs and many more.

The outlet also contains an upper floor with a Vue cinema which contains 8 screens. A large food court is also located on the upper level with many fast food outlets such as McDonald's, Subway and Chopstix. Many restaurants are also nearby such as Pizza Hut, Pizza Express and Hot Flame World Banquet.

A Paradise Island Adventure Golf venue existed there from 2012 until its closure in 2025. It was replaced by a trampoline park.
