= Districts of Redditch =

Areas of Redditch, Worcestershire, England

Coordinates: 52.28°N 1.93°W

Redditch
- Location within Worcestershire
- Population: 87,548
- District: Redditch
- Shire county: Worcestershire
- Region: West Midlands
- Country: England
- Sovereign state: United Kingdom
- Post town: REDDITCH
- Postcode district: B96–B98
- Dialling code: 01527
- Police: West Mercia
- Fire: Hereford and Worcester
- Ambulance: West Midlands
- UK Parliament: Redditch

Redditch is a town and local government district in Worcestershire, England. The town is divided into separate districts. All street-name signs in Redditch have the street name in white lettering on a blue background and the district name in black lettering on a white background at the bottom of the sign. In the New Town areas, the roads are usually named in alphabetical order and house numbering in the cul-de-sac closes is consecutive, starting with number 1.

== Abbeydale ==
Abbeydale, along with Batchley, and The Mayfields in Southcrest, were post-WWII 1950s housing estates built to cope with a population boom and the local council's enforcement of the Conservative government's 'Homes for Heroes' pledge after the 1951 United Kingdom general election. The estate consists of both standard brick houses and those of Wimpey no-fines construction; the latter of which are primarily found on the cul-de-sacs adjoining Gibbs Road.

Abbeydale is located at the eastern end of Easemore Road (forming part of the National Cycle Route 5), close to Park Way, a bus-only road.

== Batchley ==
Redditch United F.C.'s Valley Stadium and the Redditch Cricket, Hockey, Rugby and Squash Club are located off Bromsgrove Road, in Batchley.

Batchley was originally a pre-WWII housing estate which has continued to expand to meet need for affordable accommodation until the present day. The original estate included many Orlit prefabricated houses, and though none remain today, they were still present into the 1980s. Batchley has an equal mixture of privately owned, private rental and social housing, hosting a number of diverse, cultural and socio-economic groups.

It has three local schools - Batchley First School, Pitcheroak School and Birchensale Middle School. Bridley Moor High School also used to be a school in the area, before being closed in the Redditch Review. It has a park and fishing lake called Batchley Pond. There are a number of small privately owned local shops and a Tesco Express with external ATM on Batchley Road. It is within a short walking distance of Redditch Town Centre.

== Brockhill ==
Situated in the north west of the town. Almost entirely a modern residential area and home to many housing estates that to this day are still being constructed since 1996. The Brockhill East development, also known as "Meadow View", is the construction of 960 homes and a new district centre for Brockhill. The Holyoakes Field First School was also moved onto this new housing estate.

The district lends its name to Brockhill (HM Prison), a Young Offenders Institution at the Hewell Grange complex.

== Church Green ==
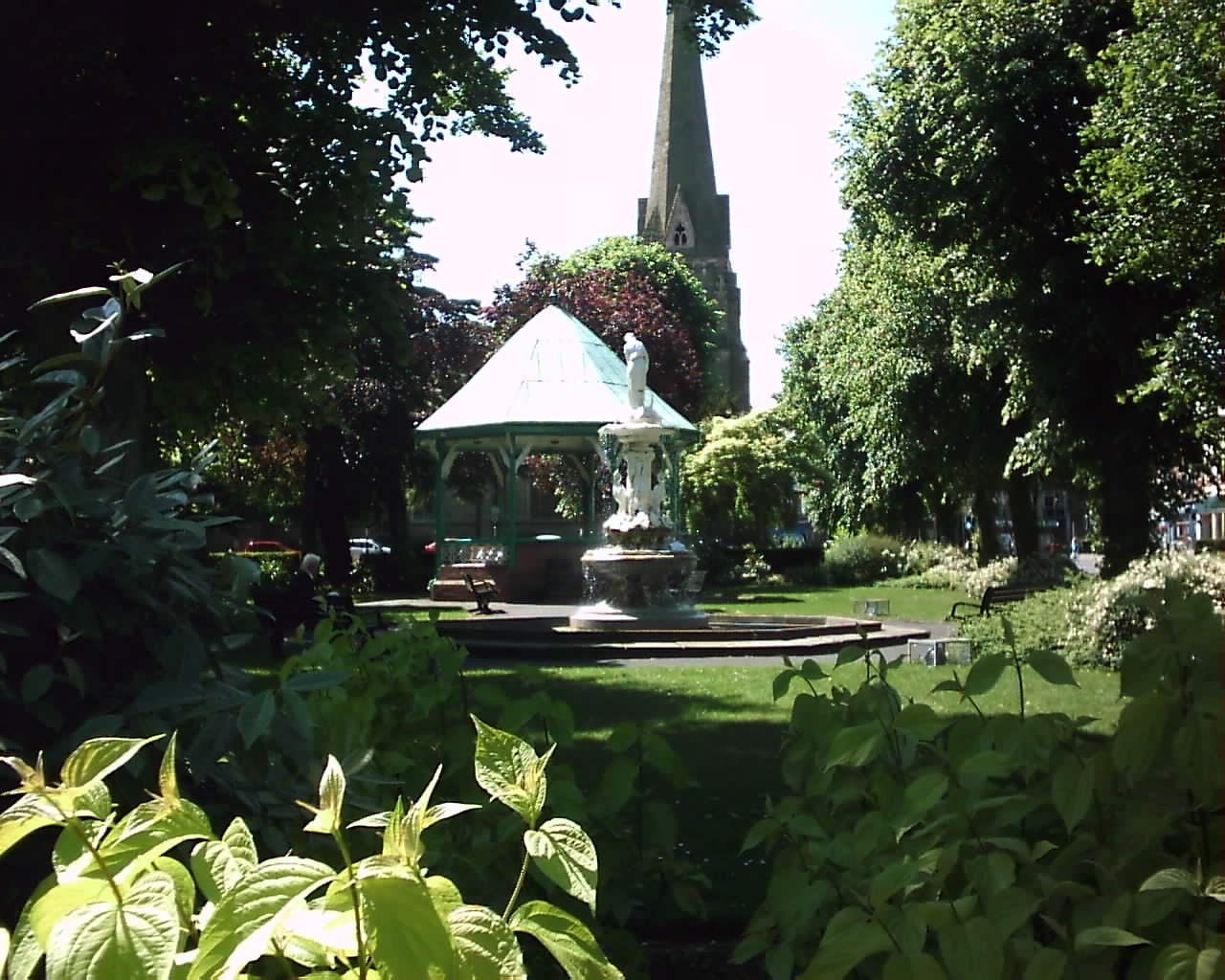
Church Green and St. Stephen's Church in central Redditch

A commercial district and public space in the centre of Redditch, Church Green forms part of the town centre; however, it is treated as a district and typically appears in addresses for buildings located there. Church Green forms a traditional centre for the town, like a village green or town square, and features a bandstand and fountain (see picture, right). Dominated by St Stephen's Church, it is home to several banks, estate agents, charity shops, a Chinese restaurant, and other businesses.

Church Green West historically formed part of the major trunk road, A441 from Birmingham to Evesham.

== Church Hill ==
The largest estate in Redditch, occupying the north-east corner of the town.

Church Hill is one of the more recent Redditch developments, beginning in 1975. Church Hill has a distinctive layout similar to the Radburn model, with access roads Paper Mill Drive, Ravensbank Drive and Moons Moat Drive largely encircling the estate. Residences are almost exclusively built around cul-de-sacs. The estate comprises Moon's Moat, Marlfield Barn, and Bomford Hill which boasts a Peace Memorial. Unlike the many monotenure housing estates in the UK and globally, but in common with many newer estates in Redditch Church Hill is divided into districts correlated with tenure:

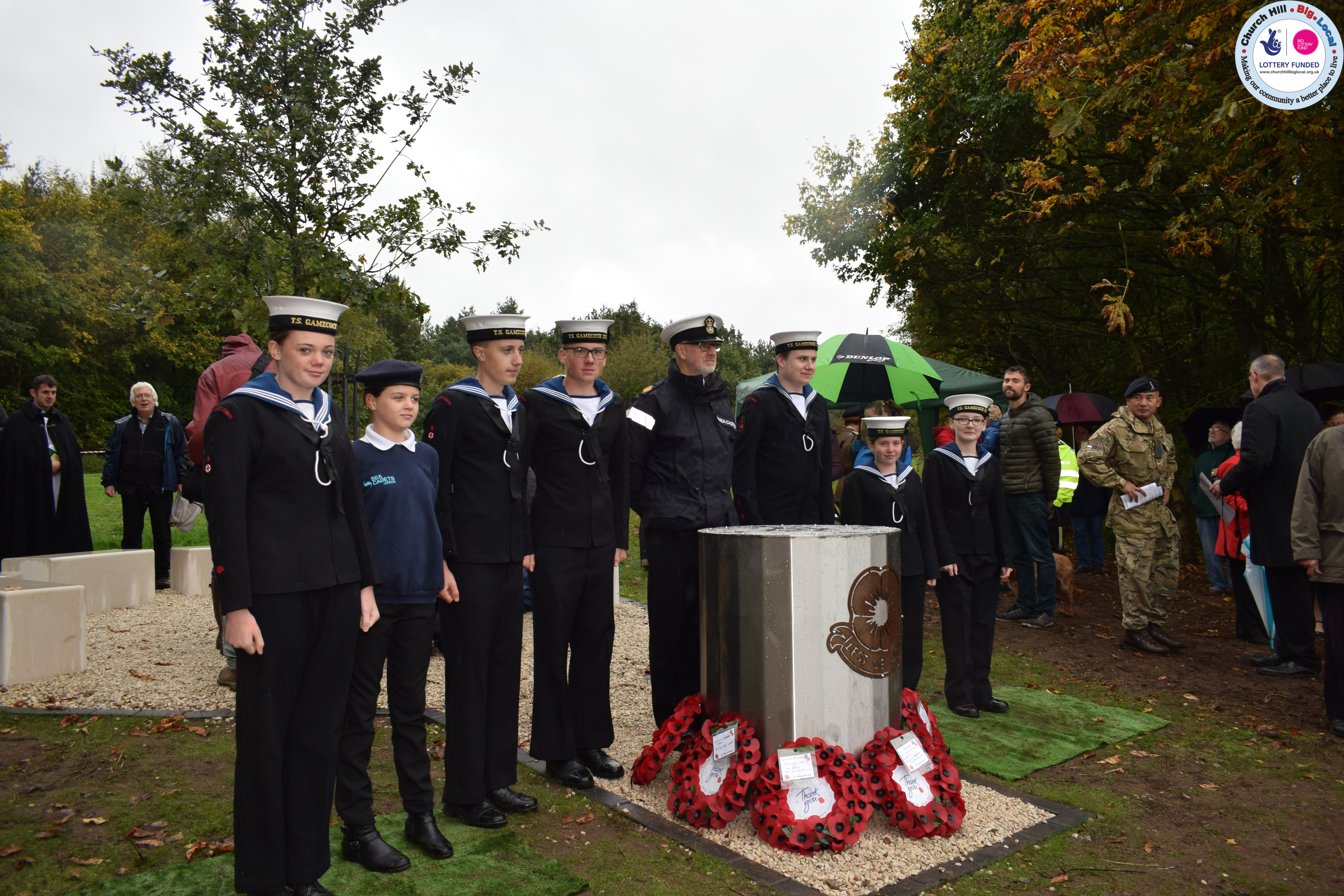
Bomford Hill Peace Memorial in Church Hill.

- Church Hill North - primarily private residential
- Church Hill Centre - a small commercial centre with a community centre and flats run by the YMCA, a medical centre, dentist, shops and a take-away, and first and middle schools.
- Church Hill South - primarily social housing

The North and South parts are separated by Church Hill Way (a bus-only road), with Church Hill Centre in the middle. Church Hill's geometric layout, a characteristic of planned new town developments, largely separates private (North) residents from social (South) residents in their day-to-day lives, whilst bringing together the children of both sides of the community at common schools.

Church Hill is home to three schools: Abbeywood First School and Church Hill Middle School in Church Hill Centre, and Moon's Moat First School in Church Hill South. Church Hill North previously had two first schools, Ravensbank First School (then changed to the present Abbeywood First School) and Marfield Farm First School; however, this has since been closed and demolished.

The estate is named after St Leonard's Church and the hill it stands on slightly north of Church Hill at Beoley.

== Enfield ==
Named after the Royal Enfield Motorbike factory, the area is mainly an industrial estate. The area was greatly improved during the industrial revolution as a main area in the town for the production of needles and fishing hooks. It is also the location of Mettis Aerospace, which during World War Two, was a producer of parts for Spitfire aircraft. Opposite Mettis Aerospace on Windsor Road was the old Redditch Gas works, which have now been demolished and replaced with a series of apartment blocks and houses.

Enfield is also the home to a new £18-million Police and Fire station, which is part of West Mercia Police and the Hereford and Worcester Fire and Rescue Service. There is also a small retail park nearby which includes a Sainsburys supermarket and B&M supermarket, which is next to the Royal Mail Delivery Office. On Elm Road, next to the railway line, is the Driver and Vehicle Standards Agency test centre for North Worcestershire.

== Feckenham ==
Feckenham is, in practical terms, a separate village, but is governed by Redditch Borough Council and counts administratively as a district.

Feckenham village arose because it straddled the ancient saltway track between Alcester and Droitwich (later a Roman road, now the modern B4090 road), and the early stretches of the Bow Brook.

Feckenham Forest once covered a substantial area of Worcestershire. It was used as a Norman royal hunting forest, and there was a royal hunting lodge near the village.

== Greenlands ==
Greenlands is situated in between Woodrow & Lodge Park, branching off Greenlands Drive and Studley Road. Greenlands consists of 1950s, 1960s and 1970s built housing estates.

It is also home to the South Redditch Sports & Social Club and The Greenlands pub (formerly the Mayfly Public House), which has been there since 1958. There are also some shops off Dowler's Hill Crescent, near to the St John the Evangelist Church, including an off-licence and a Chinese takeaway.

== Headless Cross ==
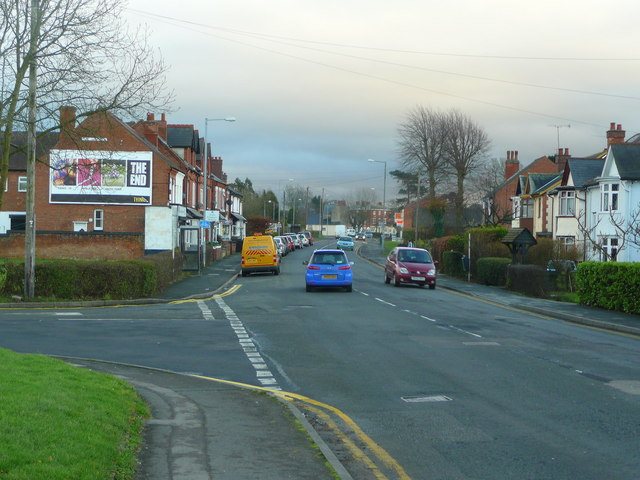
Birchfield Road, Headless Cross

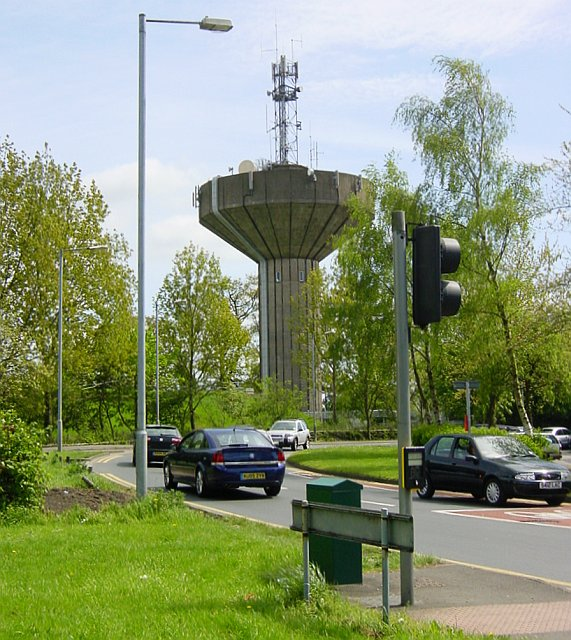
Water Tower, Headless Cross

Like Crabbs Cross, Headless Cross was once a village in its own right, it is thought to be named after Headless Cross farm, which was situated roughly where Vaynor Drive is today. Headless Cross may be derived from Smeethehedley, meaning "heath-clearing", itself an indication of a role in Feckenham Forest.

Keeping with the Redditch tradition of needle manufacture, Headless Cross once accommodated 3 needle works: the Needle Factory, located where Stonehouse Close is today; Phoenix Works on Birchfield Road, and Mount Pleasant Mill on Evesham Road. A large brickworks was situated on Marlpit Lane, as well as a smaller one along Birchfield Road.

There are 2 schools in Headless Cross: The Vaynor First School and Walkwood CE Middle School, both located on Feckenham Road.

Due to its slight altitude advantage, both of Redditch's water towers were built in Headless Cross. The old one still stands having been converted into a private residence. The distinctive shape of the new water tower has become something of a local icon and can be seen dominating the skyline from as far as the Hollybush Inn on Gorcott Hill, approximately 6 km to the east in Warwickshire.

The village also inspired the 1989 Black Sabbath song 'Headless Cross' which features on the album of the same name.

Headless Cross is also the site of an Iron Age hill fort.

== Ipsley ==
Ipsley is home to the corporate headquarters of engineering firm GKN and the former headquarters of Solicitors Regulation Authority, which has since been transformed into apartments. It is also home to St Peter's Church on Ipsley Church Lane. In common with Winyates Green, all homes in the Ipsley estate are privately owned.

Ipsley appeared in the Domesday Book as Epeslei, recording 23 households. Its name is thought to come from 'Ippe's leah', meaning "Ippe's meadow". It was formerly in Fernecumbe Hundred and Barlichway Hundred.

== Lakeside ==
Lakeside is a largely industrial area of the town. Its location is in close proximity to the Arrow Valley Park. There is also a small housing estate. It is home to St. Bede's Catholic Middle School, the only Catholic Middle School in Redditch.

== Lodge Park ==
The first houses of the estate built on the Studley Road began construction in the end of the 1950s and finished in the mid-60s to be added to in the 1980s at the top of Barlich Way. There are ten different designs of housing in Lodge Park many with their own garages, not including the architects house, which stands on a corner of Barlich Way and Red Hill, which features a double garage and a utility room.

Lodge Park is home to Studley Road Social Club and Lodge Park Social Club, with the latter overlooking Lodge Pool. There is a small shopping centre on Shakespeare Avenue, home to Tesco Express. Lodge Park is also home to Woodfield Academy, a middle school, and Oak Hill First School.

== Matchborough ==
Matchborough is a large district of Redditch. Its location lies between Winyates, Ipsley and Washford in the New Town. Matchborough has two areas, Matchborough East, off Milhill Road, and Matchborough West.

Matchborough also has a small shopping centre called Matchborough Centre, off Matchborough Way, which is adjacent to Matchborough Pond, and the area's two schools: Arrow Vale High School and Matchborough First School.

== Moons Moat ==
The district of Moon's Moat is an industrial and business estate in the north east of Redditch between Church Hill and Winyates, which takes its name from a medieval moated site which is nearby to the south west. Today a flat rectangular island surrounded by water from a stream, the site was in use from the late 13th or early 14th century until the 17th century. Archaeological excavations in the 20th century found cobbled surfaces and stone building foundations.

== Oakenshaw ==
Oakenshaw is a largely residential area with a mix of privately owned and social housing. There is a prominent McDonald's in the centre of Oakenshaw on the A441 roundabout. Oakenshaw is also home to Tesco Extra, which lies against Redditch's notable cloverleaf junction.

This area gets its name from Oakenshaw Farm, sometimes known as Pheasant Farm. The farm was where the underpass from Tesco to Greenlands is today, and a small lane ran from opposite Yvonne Road in Crabbs Cross to Oakenshaw Road in Greenlands, in modern Oakenshaw.

=== Oakenshaw South ===
Oakenshaw South was built in the 1980s and consists of eleven residential closes, all leading off Grangers Lane.

Built on land once belonging to Woodrow Farm, the particularly long pathway dividing Oakenshaw South is the old lane linking The Slough to Woodrow Farm and then onto Studley Road. The Bridleway adjacent to Yarr Mill Close was the first stretch of the lane off The Slough, and the pathway opposite carries on until the bend, where the lane was lifted to build Stoneleigh Close. The lane continues south towards Woodrow Drive, then rises to a path which was once the Redditch to Evesham railway line. Woodrow Farm was just before the rise and bend of the path, on the left looking towards the Rough Hill Drive roundabout. The old lane continued through what is now Bushley Close, Woodrow North to the Studley Road junction at Woodrow Centre.

== Park Farm ==
Park Farm is an area in south-east Redditch largely comprising industrial and commercial properties. It is home to Redditch's Household Recycling Centre.

== Riverside ==
The Redditch area of Riverside runs alongside the River Arrow. Located between the areas of Enfield and Abbeydale is the location of Forge Mill Needle Museum and the ruins of Bordesley Abbey. Also located in Riverside is the Abbey Stadium Sports Complex and Redditch Crematorium. The Abbey Stadium has a swimming pool built in 2011. It gained some notoriety at that time as it is partially heated using waste heat from the nearby Crematorium.

== Smallwood ==
Named for the Smallwood Brothers, this area of Redditch contains the Smallwood Almshouses and the old Victorian factories of Millsborough House. It is also the location of a B&Q outlet, ASDA Superstore and Matalan. It also is the location of the Redditch Central Mosque.

== Southcrest ==
Southcrest is a residential area of Redditch located on and to the south of Mount Pleasant, between the Town Centre and Headless Cross. It houses the Southcrest Manor Hotel and Plymouth Road Cemetery, and is one of the oldest areas of Redditch. Most of the older buildings date from the late Victorian era and include Southcrest Works, which have now been renovated into privately owned apartments.

== St Georges ==
St Georges is a residential area of Redditch to the south east of the Town Centre. It is home to St George the Martyr Church, Our Lady of Mount Carmel Church, and St Georges Church of England First School. It is largely based around the roads of Beoley Road West and St Georges Road.

== Town Centre ==
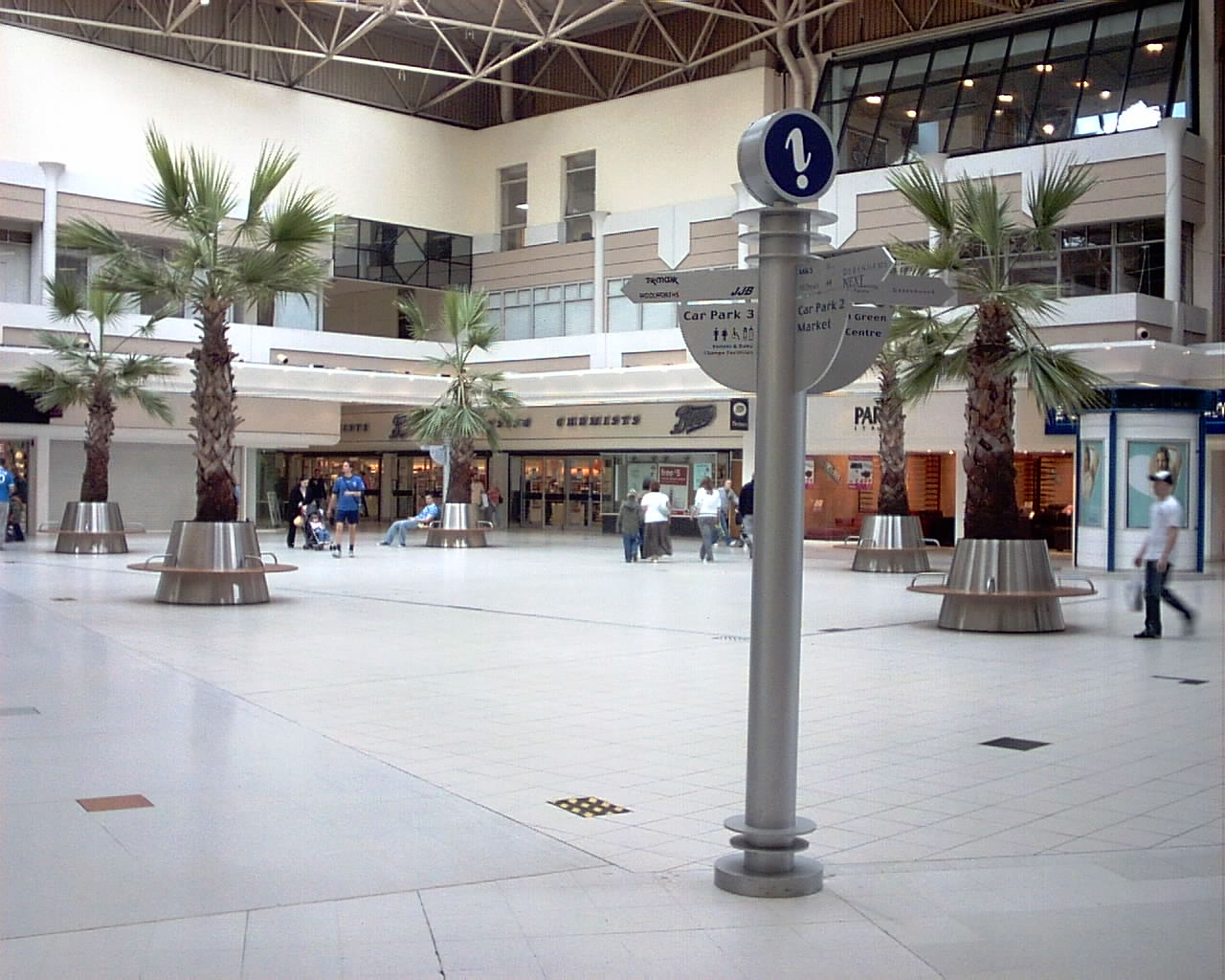
Worcester Square layout

The primary commercial core of Redditch is the indoor Kingfisher Shopping Centre. Designed like an out of town mall facility, with fully covered walkways and integrated multi-storey car parks, the Kingfisher Centre was built in place of several established Redditch town centre streets. The walkways are named after these streets. The centre, along with Church Green and municipal buildings such as the Redditch Town Hall, Redditch Library and Heart of Worcestershire College are enclosed on three sides by the raised one-way, three-lane Redditch Ringway. Designed for access to the car parks, it illustrates the early Roads for Prosperity approach in new town design philosophy applied in the UK in the 1980s.

== Walkwood ==
Walkwood is a small suburb of Redditch and is home to the Bramley Cottage Inn and Walkwood Coppice, a nature reserve. Nearby is Morton Stanley Park, a large open area of parkland, which hosts the annual Morton Stanley Festival.

== Washford ==
Washford is primarily a modern industrial estate in south-east Redditch. It is home to the corporate headquarters of automotive and bicycle accessories retailer Halfords, along with large compressor manufacturer Gardner Denver who have their UK headquarters situated on the old Hydrovane site on Claybrook Drive. The estate also comprises many smaller businesses along the Hemming Road industrial estate.

It is named after the Washford Mill, which is now a popular public house and restaurant, though a Mill has stood on this site since 1066 and is mentioned in the Domesday Book. Many areas of Redditch have similar very early origins: Ipsley, Batchley, Feckenham, Bordesley and Beoley were all Saxon settlements.

== Webheath ==
Webheath is a district of Redditch, in Worcestershire, England. The district borders Batchley and Callow Hill. It is also near Feckenham and Astwood Bank. Webheath used to be a village in its own right but is now part of the town of Redditch.

Webheath is home to two first schools, both located on Downsell Road:

- Webheath Academy Primary School
- Mount Carmel Catholic First School

== Winyates ==
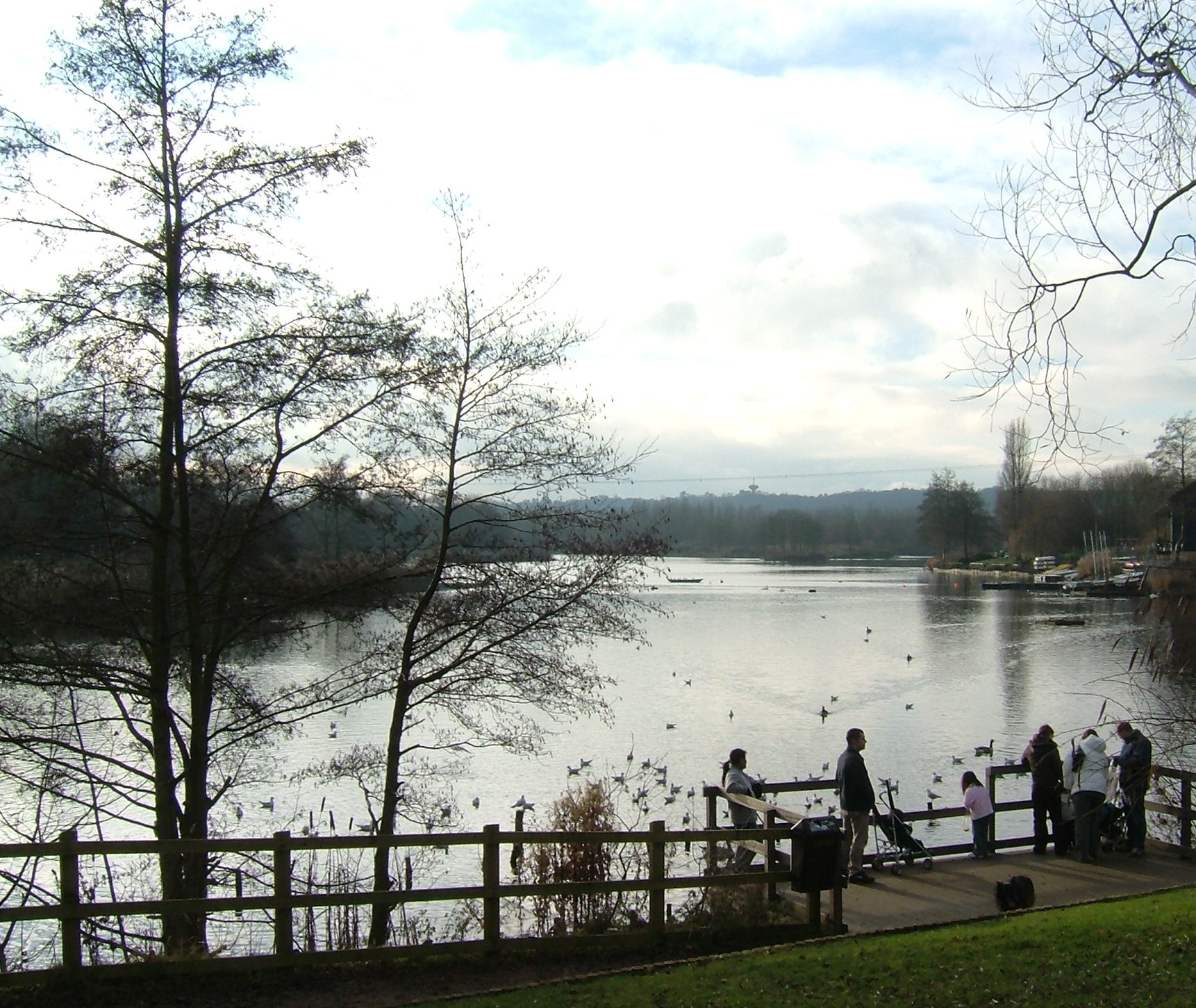
Arriving at Arrow Valley Lake from the East

Winyates is a new town estate in eastern Redditch. It comprises:

- Winyates West
- Winyates East
- Winyates Green, to the east of Winyates East

The West and East areas are separated by Winyates Way, a continuation of Church Hill Way and Matchborough Way, which is largely a bus lane though access is available to Winyates Shopping Centre. Winyates West adjoins Arrow Valley Country Park, accessible by a footpath under Battens Drive.

Winyates is home to the Ipsley Alders Marsh Nature Reserve which is an SSSI.

Tenacres First School is located in Winyates East. Ipsley Middle School and Roman Way First School are located in Winyates West.

== Wirehill ==
Wirehill is a small estate which only contains houses. It is located opposite what was once The Jolly Farmer pub in Woodrow, and lies on the same road as the Alexandra Hospital. It is only accessible by Nine Days Lane. The entrance to Wirehill Woods, which is an area of special scientific interest (SSSI) can also be found here.

== Woodrow ==
This area gets its name from Woodrow Farm which in fact, was located where Oakenshaw South is today. Some closes in Woodrow, such as Bushley and Cropthorne, are remains of the old Woodrow Farm lane, which started at the Studley Road junction, where Woodrow Centre is today, ending at the Slough in Crabbs Cross.

Woodrow consists of three areas: Woodrow Centre, Woodrow North and Woodrow South. Woodrow North is council housing, whereas Woodrow South is a mix of private and council dwellings. Woodrow Centre is a district shopping centre, home to Woodrow Community Centre and Woodrow Library, as well as flats above. There are two schools in Woodrow: St Thomas More Catholic First School in Woodrow Centre, and Woodrow First School in Woodrow South.

The Alexandra Hospital is located in Woodrow.

== Sources ==
- Bowen, AR (1952). "The Hill-Forts of Worcestershire and its Borders". Transactions of the Worcestershire Archaeological Society. New Series. XXIX: 33–37.
