= Vincent Gaffney =

British archaeologist

Vincent Gaffney MBE FSA
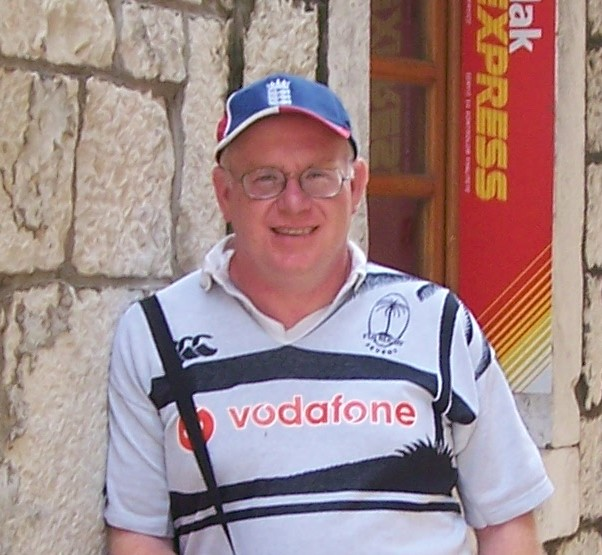
- Professor Gaffney in 2006
- Born: 25 February 1958 (age 68)
- Relatives: Christopher Gaffney (brother)

Academic background
- Education: University of Reading
- Thesis: Aspects of the archaeology of Hvar (1992)

Academic work
- Discipline: Archaeology
- Sub-discipline: Prehistory; GIS in archaeology
- Institutions: Wessex Archaeology; University of Birmingham; University of Bradford

Vincent Gaffney MBE FSA (born 25 February 1958) is a British archaeologist and the Anniversary Chair in Landscape Archaeology at the University of Bradford.

Gaffney has directed research projects around the world. Most recently, he has become known for his work on Doggerland, a submerged landmass that existed in the North Sea in the early Holocene. Other recent work includes the Anglo-Austrian "Stonehenge Hidden Landscapes Project", The Curious Travellers Project, the Adriatic islands Project, and the pit alignment at Warren Fields He was Co-PI on the EPSRC GG-TOP Gravity Gradient Project. Other fieldwork has included analysis of Roman villas on the Berkshire Downs (UK), survey at Roman Wroxeter, Diocletian's Palace, the Cetina Valley in Croatia, Forum Novum and Cyrene, Libya.

== Early life and education ==
Born 25 February 1958 in Newcastle upon Tyne, Gaffney was educated at Westgate (Arthurs) Hill School and Rutherford Comprehensive School. His interest in archaeology originated during his days at Westgate Hill Primary School in Newcastle upon Tyne: as part of an annual school trip, his class were taken to the Roman Wall, visiting sites such as the Mithraeum at Carrawburgh and the forts at Chesters and Housesteads. Encouraged by a grandfather with similar interests, he was fortunate enough to attend the Vindolanda excavations - sponsored by Rutherford Comprehensive - where he experienced archaeology first hand and met Robin and Anthony Birley on the site. His brother Christopher Gaffney also became an archaeologist.

His undergraduate and postgraduate degrees were taken at the Department of Archaeology at the University of Reading. Taking his first degree at the University of Reading, he studied with Richard Bradley, Michael Fulford and Robert Chapman and cut his archaeological teeth in field schools at sites including the Roman town at Silchester and the prehistoric enclosure at South Lodge. His PhD at Reading was on the archaeology of the island of Hvar in Croatia, and was titled "Aspects of the archaeology of Hvar" (1992).

== Career ==
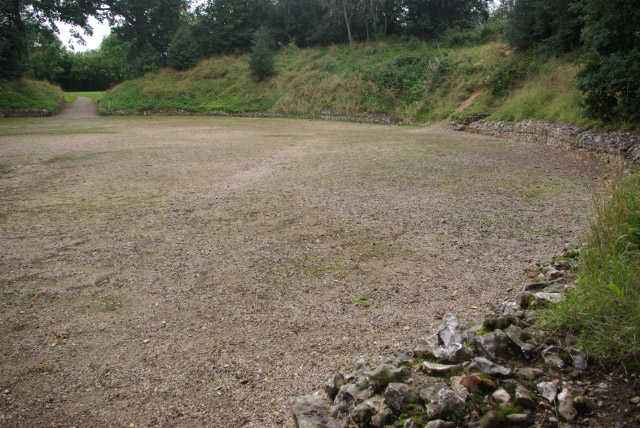
Calleva Atrebatum - Amphitheatre

=== 1980s ===
Having spent some time working with Julian Richards on his Berkshire Barrows Project, Gaffney followed Julian after graduation to the newly formed Wessex Archaeology Unit to work on the Stonehenge Environs Project. In 1981 he returned to Berkshire to work on the Maddle Farm Project with Martin (Mog) Tingle. The Maddle Farm Project was a survey aimed at studying the prehistoric and Roman settlement of the Berkshire Downs and gained some recognition for its detailed reconstruction of the economy of a single villa at Maddle Farm from the distribution of surface artefacts. Following work at Maddle Farm, from 1983 Gaffney worked at Bordesley Abbey and at the Forge Mill Museum in Redditch. In 1985 he decided to return to academic archaeology and to take a PhD, initially with John Bintliff and Božidar Slapšak. Funded by the British Council, as a bilateral agreement with Yugoslavia, and then the British Academy, he intended to work on the hillfort at Rodik on the Slovenian karst. As this was not possible he moved his research area to the island of Hvar and to work with Branko Kirigin and Nikša Vujnonović. Together they surveyed the archaeological sites of the island and this work contributed to his PhD, submitted under Fulford at the University of Reading.

=== 1990s ===
The development of Gaffney's PhD into a larger project was delayed by the fragmentation of Yugoslavia and the war leading to the independence of Croatia. However, during this period, the Eastern Hvar survey, led by Tim Kaiser, Branko Kirigin and John Hayes, was reformulated into the Adriatic Islands Project in 1991/2 . The project aimed to study settlement associated with the peculiar arrangement of the coastline in central Dalmatia. Here, the myriad of small islands and good harbours provided numerous opportunities for interaction and the region has easy access south to Greece, north to the Po valley. The string of islands also enables "line of sight" travel from the Balkan coast to Italy. Despite the war, the Adriatic Island Project continued to operate through to 1996 and surveyed archaeological sites across Brač (with Zoran Stančič), Šolta, Vis, Palagruža and many smaller islands. The results demonstrated the role of long-distance contacts in settlement development, plus the nature of direct intervention and colonisation, either by expansive local groups or major colonial powers including Greek city states or Rome. The project undertook excavations at Grabčeva Špilja, the Greek colony at Pharos, Krajcina Spilja and the hilltop enclosure at Škrip. It was during this project that Gaffney was attracted to the use of geographic information systems (GIS) for archaeological analysis. After working for a brief time with Fred Limp and Ishmael Williams at the Arkansas Archaeological Survey, later CAST, he and Zoran Stančič, then a PhD student at Ljubljana, published one of the first extensive archaeological publicationsin Europe using GIS and data from the island of Hvar.

In 1992, Gaffney was employed at the University of Birmingham, rising from a research fellow at the Birmingham University Field Archaeology Unit (BUFAU) – later Birmingham Archaeology. During this time, he established archaeological computing, in academic terms, at the department. In 1996 he received funding from the Leverhulme Trust to study the Roman town at Wroxeter, Viriconium Cornoviorum. As part of a team with Simon Buteux, Roger White, Martin van Leusen and Christopher Gaffney, the Wroxeter Hinterland Project undertook the first complete geophysical survey of a complete Roman Town in Britain, in collaboration with researchers from across the world. The University of Birmingham was awarded the Queen's Anniversary Prize in 1996 for this research.

At the end of the 90s, Gaffney, with Ron Yorston, Ann Woodward and Sally Exon, undertook the Stonehenge Landscapes Project using java-applets to explore the GIS data from a major digital landscape study of the Stonehenge Landscape, incorporating tens of thousands of GIS viewsheds as part of the interactive publication.

=== 2000s ===
During the first decade of the 21st century Vince Gaffney was increasingly engaged within academic management. After initially taking a part-time lectureship in the Department of Ancient History and Archaeology at Birmingham, he was given a Chair in Landscape Archaeology and Geomatics in 2004. Between 2002 and 2015 he founded, and was Director of, a larger academic grouping entitled the Institute of Archaeology and Antiquity (now the Department of Classics, Ancient History and Archaeology). Between 2008-11, he was Director of Research and Knowledge Transfer within the newly formed College of Arts and Law at the University of Birmingham. Recognising the increasing significance of visualisation within the Humanities as well as science, he, with Paul Hatton and Glynn Barratt, founded the Visual and Spatial Technology Centre (VISTA) at Birmingham. At its peak VISTA carried out multiple, global digital projects, and staff trained in the centre now work in many digital or academic groups.

Several major projects were undertaken during this time and included the study of the Warren Field pit alignment, landscape management at Fort Hood, in Texas, with Cheryl Huckerby and work with Paul Robertson and Helen Patterson at Forum Novum in the Sabina, Italy. As part of a collaboration with Ante Milosević, an Anglo-Croatian team began a project to carry out work in the extensively waterlogged Sinj field in the Cetina valley in Croatia. This acted as a logical extension of the Adriatic islands Project onto the Croatian mainland. The initial field seasons provided exceptional results in a pilot study, but were not taken further.

Returning to Stonehenge, Gaffney worked with Wolfgang Neubauer and the Ludwig Boltzmann Institute for Archaeological Prospection and Virtual Archaeology on the "Stonehenge Hidden Landscapes Project". This project undertook extensive multi-technique, geophysical and remote sensing survey in the landscape around Stonehenge. The results of surveys at the "super-henge" at Durrington Walls exposed new evidence for the development of the massive earthwork, including a series of massive features beneath the bank of the site. Initially thought to be stones, excavation with Mike Parker-Pearson demonstrated these to be evidence for a previously unknown ring of massive posts. This joint project was later judged to be the 2017 Current Archaeology Research Project of the year.

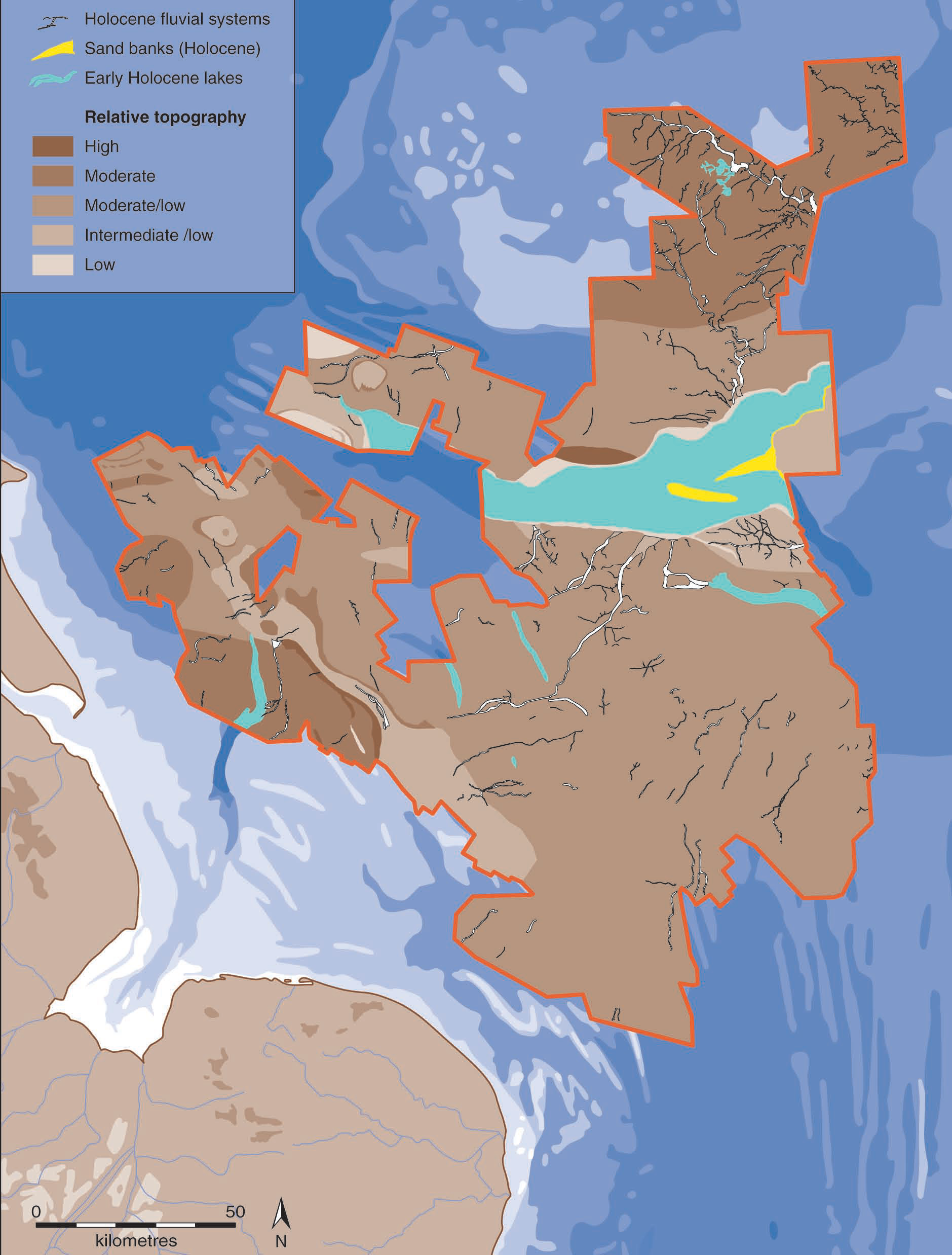
Early Holocene landscape features mapped by the North Sea Palaeolandscapes Project.

From 2003, Gaffney was increasingly concerned with Doggerland and the landscapes inundated by the North Sea following global climate change and sea level rise at the end of the last Ice Age. Initially begun as a joint PhD project, co-supervised by Ken Thomson and with Simon Fitch as student, this project sought to use seismics, collected by the energy sector, to trace the outlines of the early Holocene landscapes associated with the southern North Sea and the Dogger Banks. Following the success of this pilot study, supported by Petroleum Geo-Services, the project was extended as the North Sea Palaeolandscapes Project (NSPP). Following funding by the Aggregates Levy (English Heritage) and the National Oceanographic and Atmospheric Administration, the project mapped c. 43,000 square kilometres of early Mesolithic landscape beneath the North Sea. This work was extended to the Severn Estuary and Liverpool Bay as the Anglo-Welsh, West Coast Palaeolandscapes Project.

=== 2010s ===
The unique nature of the marine research undertaken in the North Sea, and the significance of this research, was recognised by the awarding of the European Archaeological Heritage Prize to Gaffney in 2013. Following this, a smaller project piloting the extraction of sedimentary DNA from the underwater site at Bouldnor Cliff provided evidence that DNA might be preserved in marine environments and thus provide a unique paleo-environmental record. At Bouldnor, the unexpected presence of wheat DNA in sediments dated to c. 6,000 BC caused some controversy. Currently, the presence of such material is probably explained as the product of pioneer events in advance of the spread of agriculture, and that such data are either not preserved, or present, within the terrestrial record and away from the coast.

In 2014, staffing and the capacity to undertake large-scale archaeological research withered at Birmingham following restructuring of the department, and Gaffney accepted the position of Anniversary Chair in Landscape Archaeology at the University of Bradford. Shortly after this, in 2015, he was awarded an ERC European Advanced Grant for "Europe's Lost Frontiers" (2015-2020). The project has continued to map the prehistoric landscapes of Doggerland, but has used these data to direct a programme of extensive coring of marine palaeochannels. Material from the cores has provided sedimentary DNA, as well as conventional environmental data, and these will be used in a major computational modelling programme replicating colonisation of the submerged landscape. In June 2018 he was awarded an MBE for services to scientific research (archaeology) in the Queen's Birthday Honours List

== Awards and honours ==
- MBE in the 2018 Queens Birthday Honours List
- Current Archaeology's Research Project of the Year for his excavations at Durrington Walls with Mike Parker Pearson, 2017
- European Association of Archaeologists' European Archaeological Heritage Prize, 2013
- British Archaeological Awards, best archaeological book for Europe's Lost World, 2010
- British Association for the Advancement of Science award for Heritage Presentation, 2007
- Fellow of the Society of Antiquaries of London, 2005
- Queen's Anniversary Prize for Higher Education, 1996

== Personal life ==
Gaffney's brother, Christopher Gaffney, is also an archaeologist.
