= Bordesley =

Bordesley may refer to several places in England:

- Bordesley, Birmingham, an area in the UK West Midlands
- Bordesley railway station a railway station in Birmingham
- Bordesley Junction a canal junction in Birmingham
- Birmingham Bordesley (UK Parliament constituency) a former United Kingdom Parliamentary constituency in Birmingham
- Bordesley Green, a separate area of Birmingham
- Bordesley, Worcestershire, an area of Redditch
- Bordesley Abbey, a ruined abbey near Redditch

== See also ==
- Farm, Bordesley, within the former manor of Bordesley, now part of Sparkbrook, Birmingham
