= Tudor Grange Academy =

Tudor Grange Academy may refer to:

- Tudor Grange Academy, Kingshurst
- Tudor Grange Academy, Solihull
- Tudor Grange Academy, Redditch
- Tudor Grange Academy, Worcester
