= Kingsley College =

There are two educational institutions named Kingsley College:

- Kingsley College, Melbourne, Australia
- Kingsley College, Redditch, United Kingdom
