= Christopher Gaffney (archaeologist) =

British archaeological geophysicist (born 1962)

Chris Gaffney
- Born: 14 June 1962 (age 64)
- Spouse: Susan
- Children: 2
- Relatives: Vincent Gaffney (brother)

Academic background
- Education: University of Bradford
- Thesis: The Schlumberger array in archaeological prospection
- Doctoral advisor: Arnold Aspinall

Academic work
- Discipline: Archaeology
- Sub-discipline: Geophysical survey
- Institutions: GSB Prospection; Time Team; University of Bradford

Christopher F. Gaffney (born 14 June 1962) is a British archaeological geophysicist and is Professor of Archaeological Science at the University of Bradford.

Gaffney's research interests are based on understanding how geophysical data can aide archaeology in the understanding of the life and culture of ancient peoples. In pursuing these research goals he has pursued research in challenging environments where technical excellence and novel methodological approaches can lead to enhanced interpretation of the past. In doing so, Gaffney has undertaken research and managed surveys within Britain and across the world. These have included research projects across Europe, Asia, Africa and the Americas. Significant research projects include his work as part of the Stonehenge Hidden Landscapes Project, research on World Heritage Sites at Diocletian’s Palace, Split, in Croatia and at Fountains Abbey, UK, the Greek colony at Megara Hyblaea (Sicily) and ancient Cyrene in Libya. More recently he has participated in major projects directed at broader cultural issues including the Curious Travellers project, utilising web-scraping technologies to reconstruct heritage under threat, but also projects which have sought to understand

== Personal life and education ==
Born in Newcastle upon Tyne, he was educated at Westgate (Arthurs) Hill School and Rutherford Comprehensive School, his undergraduate and postgraduate degrees were taken at the University of Bradford. His PhD at Bradford was on the Schlumberger Array in geophysical prospection for archaeology (1990).

He is married to Susan Gaffney and has two children - James Gaffney and Bella Gaffney, a noted folk singer. He is the brother of Vincent Gaffney, also a British archaeologist.

== Early career ==
Gaffney's early interest in archaeology became evident at school when he undertook voluntary work at archaeological sites including Calleva Attrebatum, the Roman town in Hampshire, excavated by Michael Fulford. Discovering that he had an interest in archaeological sciences' he decided to take his first degree at the University of Bradford, which had founded Britain's first archaeological department specialising in archaeological sciences. At Bradford he also undertook a placement at the Oxford Research Laboratory for Archaeology and the History of Art, where he worked as a technician with Martin Aitken, one of the founders of archaeometry as a distinct discipline. As an undergraduate he undertook a series of geophysical surveys including several as part of the Maddle Farm Project team. He decided to pursue this interest and undertook a PhD entitled "The Schlumberger array in archaeological prospection", under one of Britain's pioneers of archaeological geophysical survey, Arnold Aspinall. As part of his degree Chris regularly worked on and carried out research surveys as part of the Cambridge and Bradford Boeotian Archaeological and Geographical Expedition (CABBAGE), led by John Bintliff and Anthony Snodgrass.

== Commercial archaeology ==
Following his postgraduate research, Gaffney undertook commercial geophysical surveys, and eventually he and John Gater set up a partnership and traded under the name Geophysical Surveys of Bradford before renaming GSB Prospection. For nearly two decades Chris and John operated one of the country's most successful private archaeo-geophysical commercial groups. GSB Prospection carried out over 2000 projects, including work in Bulgaria, Chile, Croatia, England, France, Greece, Northern Ireland, Norway, Scotland, Slovenia, Spain, USA, Wales and Zimbabwe. Among the many significant projects Chris Gaffney undertook at GSB Prospection, the survey at Roman Wroxeter was amongst the most important and involved organising a multinational geophysical team to survey, for the first time, a complete Romano-British town. During his period at GSB Prospection Gaffney appeared in the Channel 4 archaeological television series, Time Team,. Gaffney retained key linkages with the broader academic community throughout his commercial career and, in 2004, became Editor of Archaeological Prospection. In 2006 he moved from GSB Prospection with the intention of pursuing his academic interests.

== Back to Bradford ==
In the summer of 2007, Gaffney was awarded an honorary degree by the University of Bradford for "popularising archaeological geophysics via Time Team and other media opportunities". From October 2007, he was employed as a lecturer in Archaeological Geophysics at the University of Bradford. As part of the School, Gaffney was active in founding, with Andrew Wilson, Bradford Visualisation in 2013. Bradford Visualisation (BradViz), is a research group dedicated to establishing digital methods and visualisation as an integral part of archaeological research at Bradford. The group has grown significantly since 2013 and is now managed by Gaffney, Wilson, and Vincent Gaffney and re-named Visualising Heritage. Key research projects associated with Visualising Heritage and Gaffney include "Fragmented Heritage", "Digitised Diseases", "From Cemetery to Clinic" and "Augmenting Jordanian Heritage."

Aside from these projects, he worked on a range of smaller projects including a study of the spatial and social topography of ancient Olynthos, the analysis of legacy data, for the National Roads Authority (Ireland), and the DART Project (Detection of Archaeological Residues using remote sensing Techniques). Work on the Iron Age Landscape of Chesters Hillfort investigated novel techniques to investigate aerial evidence from problematic geologies. From 2010, Gaffney was part of the Stonehenge Hidden Landscapes Project investigating the largely unmapped landscape of Stonehenge: carried out in conjunction with the University of Birmingham and the Ludwig Boltzmann Society for Archaeological Prospection and Virtual Archaeology.

Gaffney was seconded into the position of Pro Vice-Chancellor for Research and Innovation at the University of Bradford from May 2022 until October 2023.

Gaffney took on the role of Chair of the National Heritage Science Forum in January 2024.

== Former positions ==
- Archaeological Prospection, Editor, (2004–2018)
- International Society for Archaeological Prospection: Chair (2009-2013; 2017-2021) Vice-Chair (2003-7) and Honorary Secretary (2013–15), Conference Secretary ISAP 2016-17

== Select bibliography ==
- Gaffney, C., Gaffney, V., Neubauer, W., Ch’ng, E., Goodchild, H., Murgatroyd, P., Sears, G., Kirigin, B., Milosovic, A., and White R. (2016) Citiscapes without figures: geophysics, computing and the future of urban studies. In Boschi, F (ed) Looking to the future, caring for the past. Preventative archaeology in theory and practice. Bononia University Press, Bologna. 191-214.
- Bonsall, J. and Gaffney, C. (2015) Change is good: adapting strategies for archaeological prospection in a rapidly changing technological world. In Boschi, F (ed) Looking to the future, caring for the past. Preventative archaeology in theory and practice. Bononia University Press, Bologna. 41-58
- Schmidt, S., Linford, P., Linford, N., David, A., Gaffney, C., Sarris, A., and Fassbinder, F. (2015) EAC Guidelines for the Use of Geophysics in Archaeology: Questions to Ask and Points to Consider. Europae Archaeologia Consilium
- Bonsall, J.P.T, Gaffney, C.F. and Armit, I. (2014) Preparing for the Future: A reappraisal of archaeo-geophysical surveying on Irish National Road Schemes 2001-2010. Bradford
- R. H. White, C. Gaffney and V. L. Gaffney with A. Baker (2013) Wroxeter, the Cornovii and the Urban Process. Volume 2: Characterizing the City. Final Report of the Wroxeter Hinterland Project, 1994-1997. Oxford: Archaeopress
- Aspinall, A., C. F. Gaffney & A. Schmidt (2008) Magnetometry for Archaeologists. Lanham: AltaMira Press.
- Gaffney, CF and Gater, JA (2003) Revealing the Buried Past: geophysics for archaeologists. Tempus Publishing.
- Jennings, B., Gaffney, C., Sparrow, T. and S. Gaffney eds (2017) AP2017: 12th International Conference of Archaeological Prospection. Archaeopress.
- Gaffney, CF and Gaffney, VL eds (1987) Pragmatic Archaeology. Theory in crisis? BAR 167
- Bintliff, JL and Gaffney, CF eds (1986) Archaeology at the Interface: studies in archaeology’s relationships with history, geography, biology and physical science – BAR International Series 300
