= Bordesley, Worcestershire =

Village in Worcestershire, England

Coordinates: 52.327968°N 1.944237°W

Bordesley
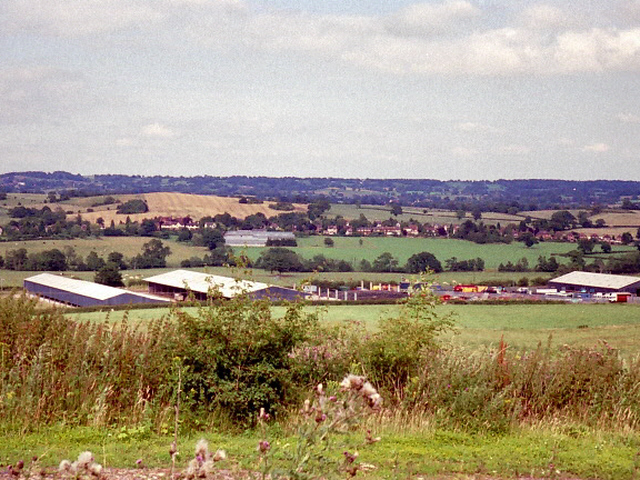
- Bordesley from Butler's Hill

- Location within Worcestershire
- OS grid reference: SP039698
  - London: 97 miles (156 km)
- Civil parish: Alvechurch
- District: Bromsgrove
- Shire county: Worcestershire
- Region: West Midlands
- Country: England
- Sovereign state: United Kingdom
- Post town: REDDITCH
- Postcode district: B97
- Dialling code: 01527
- Police: West Mercia
- Fire: Hereford and Worcester
- Ambulance: West Midlands

Bordesley is a village north of Redditch, in Worcestershire, England. Bordesley primarily comprises houses alongside the A441 Birmingham Road between Redditch and Alvechurch. The name Bordesley derives from the Old English of Brorde's Lēah, meaning the wood of someone called Brord(e).

== See also ==
- Bordesley Abbey
