= Redditch Central Mosque =

Mosque in Redditch, England, United Kingdom

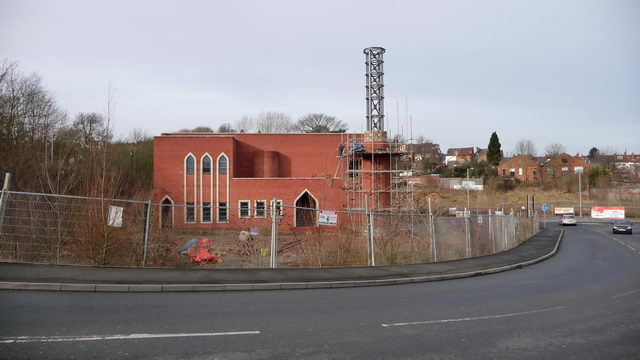
- Mosque under construction in 2009

Location
- Location: Redditch, England, United Kingdom
- Interactive map of Redditch Central Mosque

Architecture
- Type: Mosque
- Capacity: 1,500 worshippers

Redditch Central Mosque is a mosque in the town centre area of Redditch, England, run by the Redditch Mosque Committee, and is one of the largest Muslim centres in Redditch.

The mosque is open to people of all religious affiliations, men and women, and its main prayer halls currently hold between 1,000 and 1,500 people during a Friday service. Many worshippers walk through the mosque's doors during the 5 daily prescribed prayers and during multiple services held on religious festivals such as Eid.

== History ==
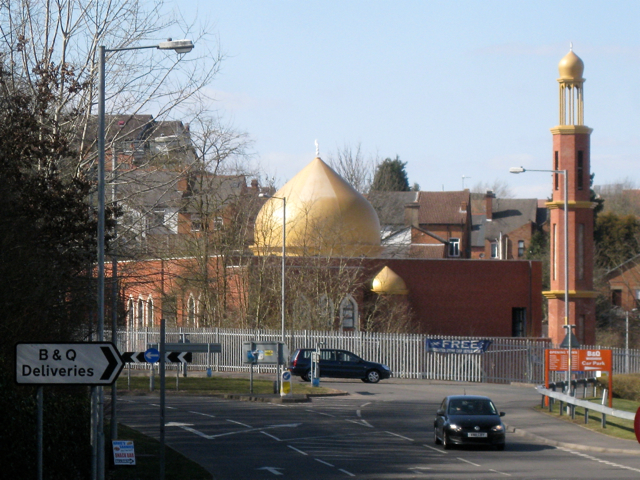
Redditch Central Masjid-E-Noor

Redditch Central Masjid-E-Noor (Redditch Mosque Trust) was founded in 1974. Trustees bought an old disused, empty property on Easmore Road, Redditch in the early 1980s. In March 2022, plans were approved to convert it into flats.

Since the 1980s, the Muslim community has grown considerably in Redditch and a new mosque was needed to house the growing number of worshippers. Money was raised by the mosque trustees to purchase a new site on Jinnah Road (named after Muhammad Ali Jinnah), Redditch in 2003. The site was previously held by Royal Enfield. Work on the £1.5 million mosque started in 2005 and completed in 2016
