= Arrow Valley Country Park =

Country park in Redditch, Worcestershire, United Kingdom

Coordinates: 52.306878°N 1.910677°W

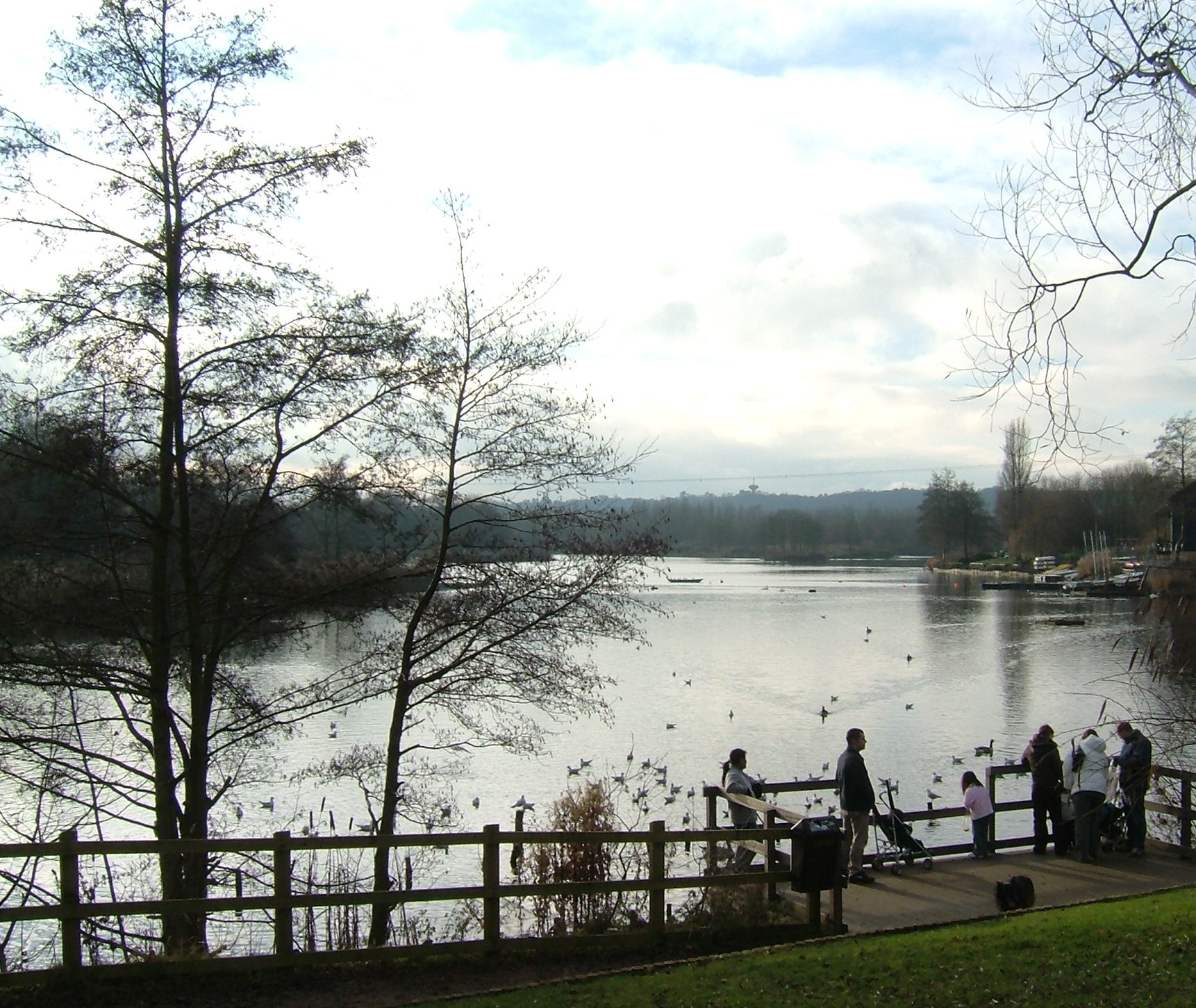
View across Arrow Valley Lake

Arrow Valley Country Park (also known as Arrow Valley Park) is a country park on the River Arrow, at Redditch, Worcestershire, England.

Built by Redditch Development Corporation in the 1970s. It has 900 acres (3.6 km^{2}) of public open space and incorporates the 27 acres (11 ha) Arrow Valley Lake, popular for dinghy sailing, fishing and birdwatching. The lake is home to Redditch Sailing Club (racing up to 14 ft (4.3 m) boats). The park was recognised with a Civic Trust Green Flag Award in 2005. A visitor centre, including the Boathouse Cafe (access off the B4497, Battens Drive) was opened in 2001 and is open every day.
