= RSA Academy Arrow Vale =

Arrow Vale High School
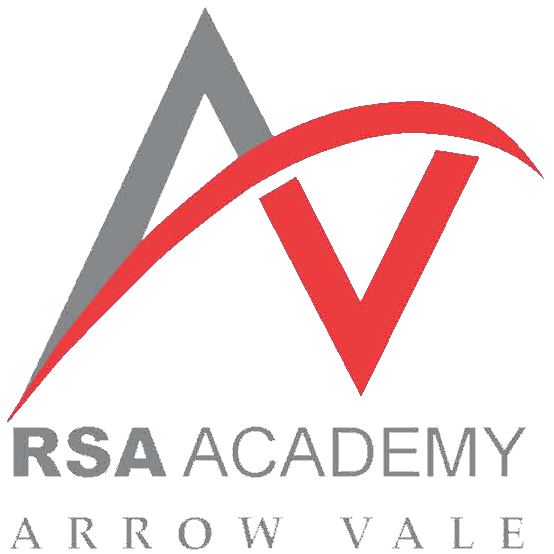

Location
- Green Sward Lane; Redditch, Worcestershire, B98 0EN; England
- Coordinates: 52°17′50″N 1°53′51″W

Information
- Type: Academy
- Motto: Together we...Discover, Aim High and Excel
- Established: 2012 (predecessor school 1976)
- Local authority: Worcestershire
- Specialist: RSA Academy
- Department for Education URN: 138505 Tables
- Ofsted: Reports
- Executive Headteacher: Ian Mellor
- Gender: Coeducational
- Age: 13 to 19
- Enrolment: 831
- Houses: Aim High Alligators, Excel Eagles, Discover Dragons
- Colours: Red, silver and black
- Website: www.arrowvaleschool.org.uk

Arrow Vale High School (formerly RSA Academy Arrow Vale) is a co-educational upper school and sixth form with academy status located in Redditch, Worcestershire, England. The school is sponsored by the Royal Society for the encouragement of Arts, Manufactures & Commerce opening as an RSA Academy in September 2012. The school is a member of the RSA Family of Academies.

It currently has around 620 students on roll with 180 in the sixth form.

== Academic results ==
Results in the predecessor school were flat lined at 29% 5A*CEM in 2007, 2008 and 2009. This rose to 33% in 2010. Change in leadership then led to series of step changes in results. In 2011, 49% of students achieved this benchmark, with 59% in 2012. In 2013, having converted to an RSA Academy, this rose to well above national figures at 64%. Students achieving 5A*G grades rose from 94% (national average) in 2012 to 99.5% in 2013.

Under the new government measure of best 8 subjects including English and maths, the progress the students made from key stage 2 to 4 was 1044 (national 1000) which represents outstanding progress.

The school's focus on disadvantaged students prompted a visit in December 2013 by The Minister of State for Schools, David Laws. Laws was interviewed by the Redditch Standard saying "with strong leadership and desire there was no reason schools could not deliver more for their students. There are too many communities and schools in the past, and some still around today, where the aspiration hasn’t been high enough and people often think because schools serve a disadvantaged catchment that is an excuse or justification for having low levels of performance. This is a brilliant example of a school that just a few years ago was producing quite unimpressive results and yet with the right leadership and the right teaching has totally transformed the outcomes for young people.”

=== Academy conversion ===
In September 2012 the school began its first year under academy status.

=== 3-tier system ===
Redditch is one of the few areas of the country where the 3-tier system of first, middle and high schools still exists. RSA Arrow Vale is a high school. The RSA have created the first structural change in Redditch to remove the negative issues in terms of performance of students, by bringing the main feeder school to Arrow Vale, Ipsley CE Middle School, into the Redditch RSA Academies Trust, thereby enabling streamlined education for young people from aged 9 to 19. The schools share resources and staffing; Ipsley became Ipsley CE RSA Academy in January 2013 and has seen very rapid improvements in outcomes for students.

== Notable alumni ==
- Jacqui Smith, MP for Redditch and former British Home Secretary, taught Economics at Arrow Vale in the 1980s.
- Jimmy Davis, footballer, was a pupil at the school from 1994 until 1999. He began his career with Manchester United, playing his only first-team game for them in November 2001, and had just been loaned to Watford when he died in a car crash in August 2003.
