= Tudor Grange Academy, Redditch =

Tudor Grange Academy

Location
- Woodrow Drive; Redditch, Worcestershire, B98 7UH; England
- Coordinates: 52°16′58″N 1°54′36″W

Information
- Type: Academy
- Established: 2014
- Department for Education URN: 132823 Tables
- Ofsted: Reports
- Chair of Governors: Jane Potter
- Principal: Marie McNamara
- Gender: Mixed
- Age: 13 to 18
- Houses: Warwick, Ragley, Packwood
- Website: http://www.redditch.tgacademy.org.uk/

Tudor Grange Academy (formally Leys High School and Kingsley College) is a secondary school and sixth form centre in Redditch, Worcestershire, England. As of October 2010 the school has approximately 250 students on roll, of which 28 are in the sixth form.

== History ==
The school began as the Lodge Farm Secondary Modern School, which became the Leys High School when it became comprehensive.

The school was designated a Specialist Arts College in September 2003 named Kingsley College and sixth form centre. for the Performing Arts. and became an academy in April 2014. Tudor Grange Academy Redditch opened in April 2014; the Academy is sponsored by its sister school, Tudor Grange Academy Solihull and the trust now consists of six schools, two primary schools and four secondary schools. The former Principal of Tudor Grange Academy Worcester, Mrs. C Maclean, has now become the Executive Principal for the Trust overseeing all schools.

== Partnerships ==
The school has partnerships with Woodrush High School, the University of Warwick, GKN, Barnardo's and Ican, a language charity.international partnerships with Kwamfundo Secondary in Western Cape, South Africa.

== Curriculum ==
The school offers core subjects and a varied curriculum for Years 9–13, that culminate in GCSE, A and AS level courses, BTEC, and diploma courses.

== Notable former pupils ==
- Joe Lolley

=== Leys High School ===
- Nigel Clark, lead singer of Dodgy

=== Lodge Farm Secondary Modern School ===
- John Bonham, drummer of Led Zeppelin

=== Kingsley College ===
- Jake Minton, archaeologist
