= Forge Mill Needle Museum =

Industry museum in Redditch, England

Coordinates: 52.315028°N 1.934262°W

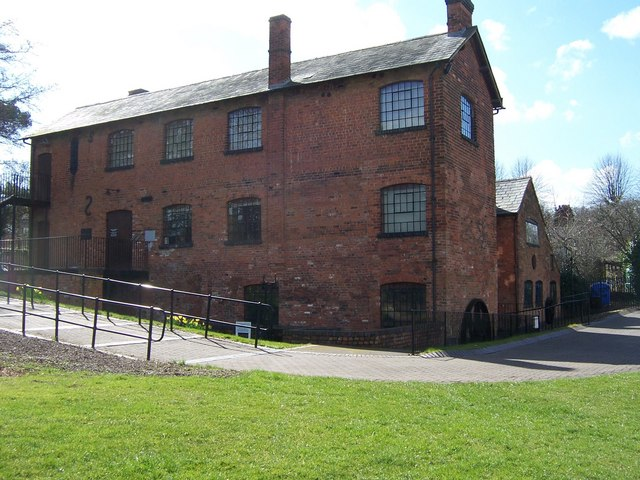
Forge Mill Needle Museum.

The Forge Mill Needle Museum in Redditch, Worcestershire, is a historic museum depicting Redditch's Industrial Heritage. Opened in 1983 by Queen Elizabeth II, it records how in Victorian times, Redditch was the international centre of the needle and fishing tackle industry and once produced 90% of the world's needles.

== History ==
Needlemaking has been recorded in the area as early as the 1639. The building was originally an iron forge, but was converted into a scouring mill for needle production in 1730. The mill became steam powered in 1870. The mill closed in 1958. At its peak in the 1870s, the area was producing around 3.5 billion needles per year, around 90% of the world's needle production. Forge Mill reopened as a museum, with Queen Elizabeth II visiting for the opening ceremony on 5 July 1983.

== Collections ==
Models and recreated scenes provide a vivid illustration of how needles were once made, and the museum organises temporary exhibitions, demonstration, and workshops on how needles were used in the textile industry. There were around 30 processes involved in the production of needles, which remain unchanged today. There are large numbers of needles and fishing hooks on display, including some produced for an exhibition in 1924. The museum is housed in a water-powered scouring mill dating from the Victorian era, the only one of its kind still remaining in operation in the world today.

The museum holds records on the family trees of those connected with the needle trade in Redditch and the surrounding area. These archives are open to the public upon request.

The museum is located near to the ruins of the 12th century Bordesley Abbey.
