= Bordesley Abbey =

Cistercian abbey near Redditch, Worcestershire, England

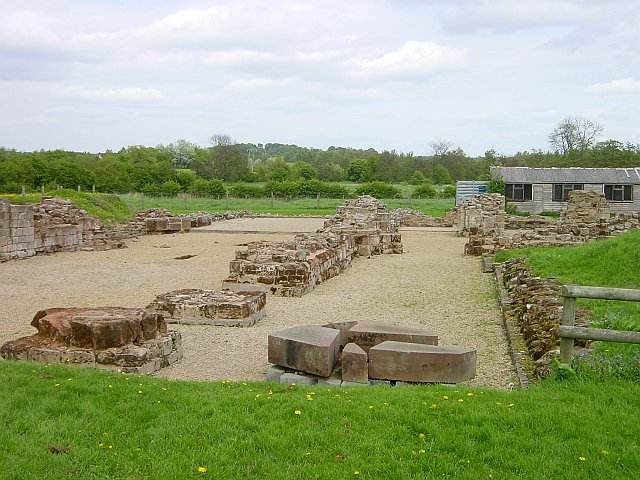
- Bordesley Abbey ruins

- Location of Bordesley Abbey in Worcestershire
- Interactive map of Bordesley Abbey

Monastery information
- Order: Cistercian
- Established: 1138 (approx.)
- Disestablished: 17 July 1538

People
- Founder: Waleran de Beaumont, Count of Meulan

Site
- Location: Redditch, Worcestershire, England
- Coordinates: 52°19′0″N 1°56′2″W
- Grid reference: SP046667
- Visible remains: Earthworks and foundations
- Public access: Yes. Managed by Redditch Borough Council.

Bordesley Abbey was a 12th-century Cistercian abbey near the town of Redditch, in Worcestershire, England.

The abbey's foundation was an act of Waleran de Beaumont, Count of Meulan, who gave the monks of Garendon Abbey in Leicestershire some more land. However, Empress Matilda laid claim to the patronage of Bordesley once Waleran surrendered to her in about 1141, thus making Bordesley a royal house.

Bordesley Abbey was once an important local ecclesiastical centre, holding political control of the ancient township of Tardebigge. It was demolished by Henry VIII during the dissolution of the monasteries in 1538 and the property was sold.

The ruins are now an archaeological site, undergoing investigation since 1969 by the University of Reading's 'Bordesley Abbey Project'. Many of the excavated items can be seen in a visitor centre and museum at the site, which is joined with the Forge Mill Needle Museum.

== Description ==
The abbey is located in the borough of Redditch in Worcestershire, on the south bank of the River Arrow, close to where it meets the Batchley Brook. Archaeological findings by the University of Reading's Bordesley Abbey Project indicate that the abbey's focus was the church building, located on a hill, with its western side embedded within the slope. This location made it prone to slipping and buttresses were added to support the building. Piers were added for extra support in the 13th century, and again in the 14th, following a major collapse of the central tower. The plan of the church was cruciform, with an aisleless presbytery, transepts each with three eastern chapels, and an aisled eight-bay nave housing the choirs of the monks and lay brothers. In the later middle ages, following the decline of the lay brothers, their choir was removed and chapels inserted in the aisles. The abbey was the burial place of Guy de Beauchamp, 10th Earl of Warwick, whose family had been among its benefactors. The claustral buildings are less well understood, as only a small part has been excavated, but this shows that the cloisters themselves were rebuilt in the late 14th century. The east range housed the chapter house and dormitory, and the south range housed the refectory, aligned north-south in the usual Cistercian manner.

The ruins of the abbey today consist of visible earthworks and walls, and parts buried underground such as the watermill and workshops. The watermill was industrial, with the wheel driving the bellows of a forge and hammers for making objects like knives and tenterhooks. The site is managed by the Forge Mill Needle Museum, which provides access to the abbey ruin, included within its entry fee as well as guided tours. The abbey has been designated by Historic England as a scheduled monument since 1957.

== History ==
Bordeseley Abbey was founded during a period known as The Anarchy, a breakdown in law and order which followed the disputed accession of Stephen, King of England. Historians generally date the founding of the abbey to 1138, when Waleran de Beaumont, Count of Meulan and Worcester filed a charter for the site. But an alternative charter by Queen Maud was recorded in the Winchcombe Annals, dated 1136 and witnessed by Waleran himself. After the Battle of Lincoln in 1141, Waleran switched allegiance from Stephen to Maud and it is possible that he renounced his own right to the abbey at that time, in deference to Maud.

The abbey was set up by Waleran as a monastery for a group of Cistercian monks, previously based at Garendon Abbey in Leicestershire. The designated area, located in the valley of the River Arrow, was predominantly marshland at the time and the monks had to drain the land and divert the river to make it suitable for building. The earliest buildings on the site were wooden, with stone constructions being built a few years later. The first part of the abbey to be completed was the church, completed in around 1150, with subsequent building taking place predominantly during five distinct periods up to the early 14th century. The abbey acquired considerable land-holdings in the area, on which it farmed produce such as cereal and wool for sale. This was managed through a system of around twenty granges, established by the early 13th century and located in Worcestershire and Warwickshire, up to 35 kilometres (22 mi) from the abbey itself. In the 13th century a gatehouse and chapel were built at the west end of the precinct. This chapel, dedicated to St Stephen, survived the Dissolution and continued to be used by the parish; it was demolished in 1805 when a new church was built in the centre of Redditch town.

The abbey closed on 17 July 1538 during the dissolution of the monasteries under King Henry VIII, when its final abbot, John Day, surrendered the land and possessions to the king. The land was sold by Henry on 23 September 1538. In 1542 the cleared site was granted to Lord Windsor, and was held by the earls of Plymouth until the 20th century. It is now owned by the borough of Redditch.

== Burials ==
- Guy de Beauchamp, 10th Earl of Warwick

== See also ==
- Bordesley, Worcestershire
