= Redditch =

Town in Worcestershire, England

- Town and borough
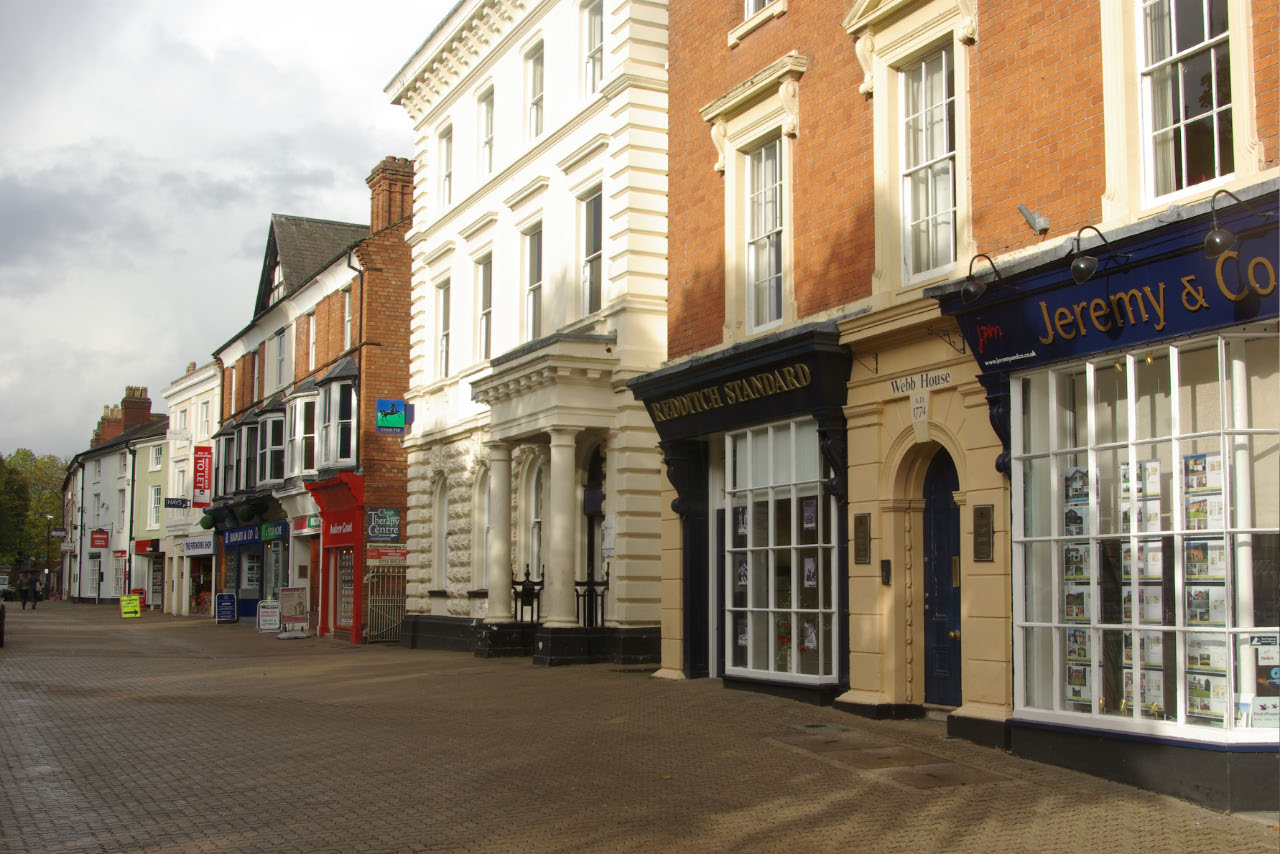
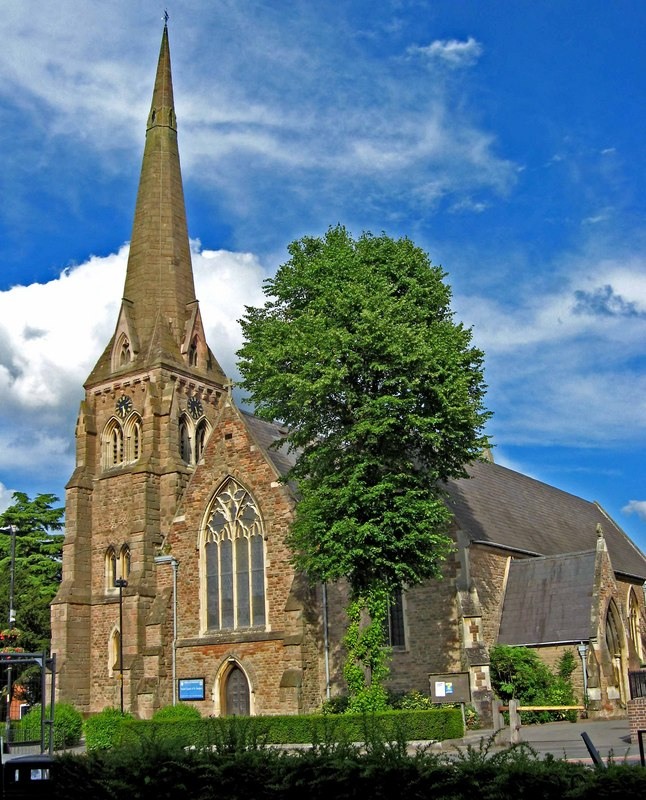
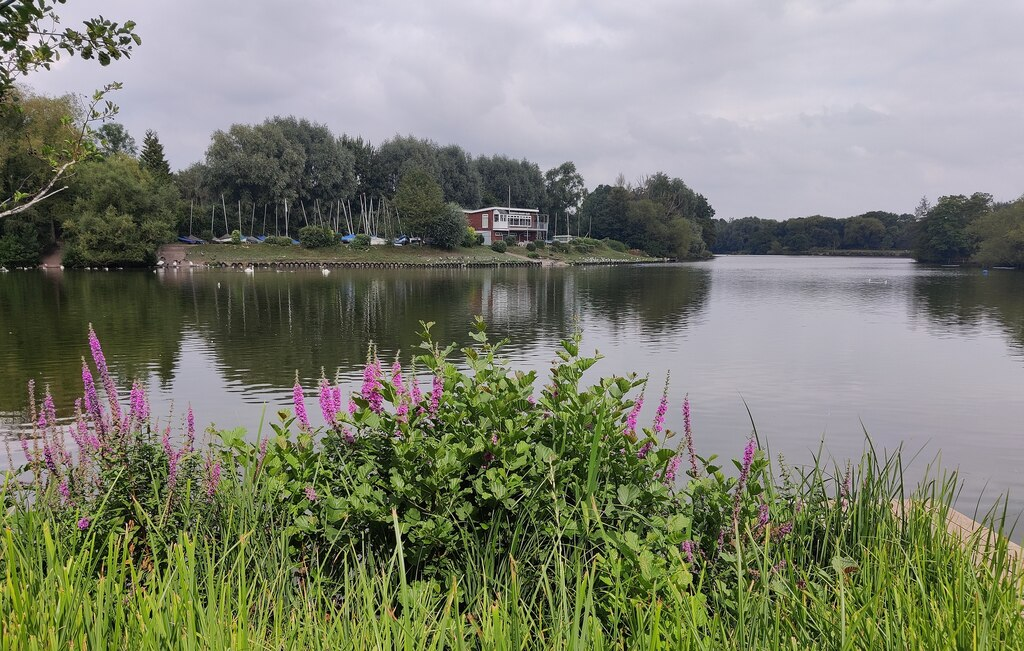
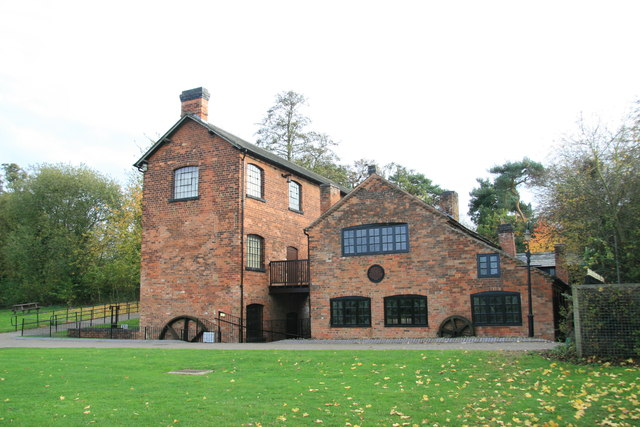
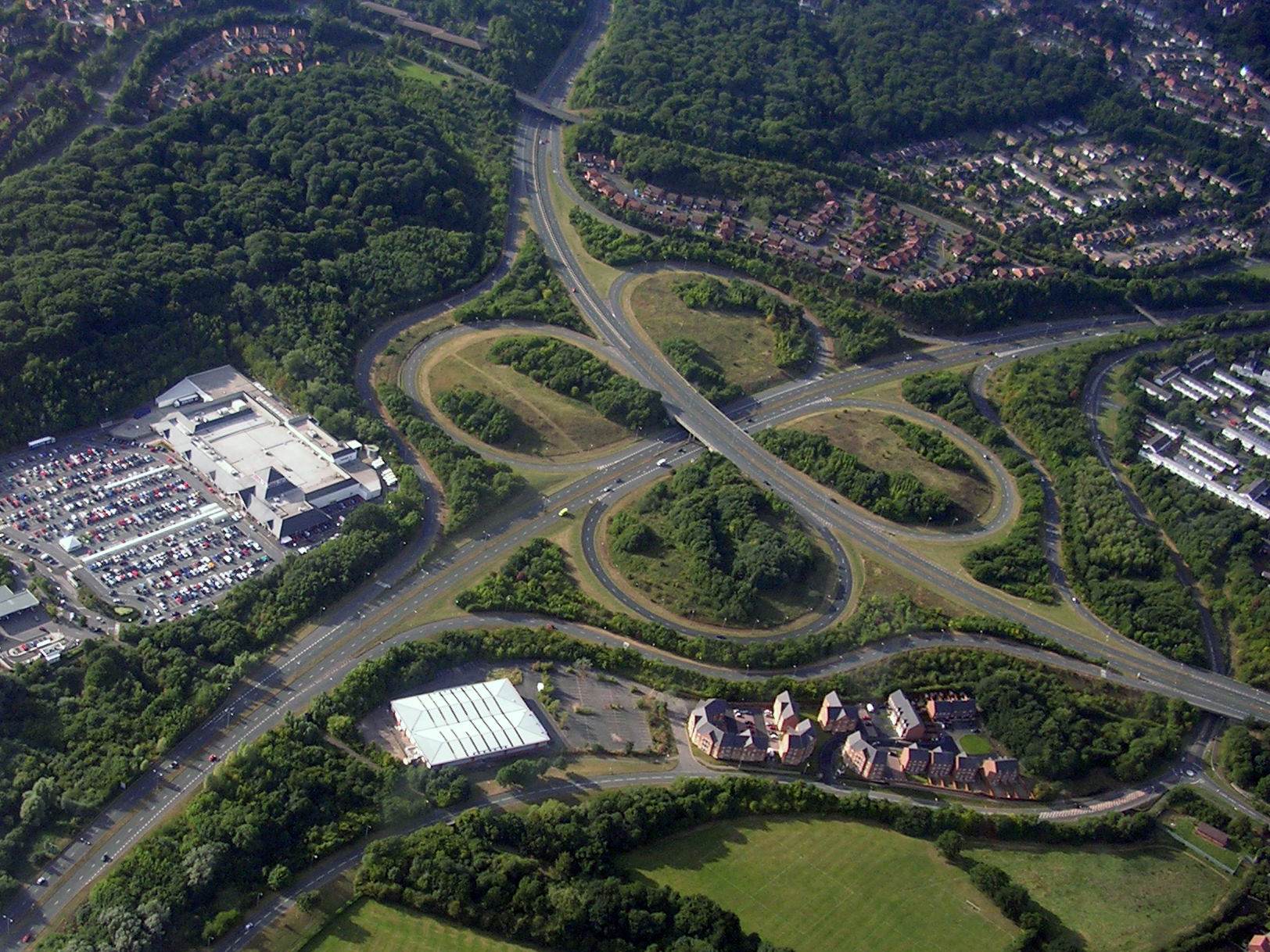
- From left to right: Top: Church Green East; Middle: Parish Church of St Stephen & Arrow Valley Lake; Bottom: Forge Mill Needle Museum & Redditch Cloverleaf Interchange

- Redditch shown within Worcestershire
- Country: United Kingdom
- Constituent country: England
- Region: West Midlands
- Ceremonial County: Worcestershire
- District: Redditch
- New Town status: 10 April 1964
- Borough status: 15 May 1980
- UK Parliament: Redditch
- District: Redditch

Government
  - Type: Non-metropolitan district council
  - Body: Redditch Borough Council
  - MP: Chris Bloore (Labour)

Area
  - District: 21 sq mi (54 km^{2})
  - Rank: 240th
- Elevation: 430 ft (130 m)

Population (2025)
  - District: 87,548
  - Rank: 273rd
  - Density: 4,180/sq mi (1,614/km^{2})
  - Urban: 81,635

Ethnicity (2021)
  - Ethnic groups: List: 89.8% White; 5.7% Asian; 2.8% Mixed; 1.2% Black; 0.6% other

Religion (2021)
  - Religion: List: 48.9% Christianity; 40% no religion; 4.2% Islam; 0.4% Hinduism; 0.1% Judaism; 0.4% Sikhism; 0.2% Buddhism; 0.4% other; 5.5% not stated
- Time zone: GMT
- Postcodes: B96, B97, B98
- Post town: redditch
- Dialling code: 01527
- ONS code: 47UD (ONS); E07000236 (GSS)
- Website: www.redditchbc.gov.uk

Redditch is a town and non-metropolitan district with borough status in Worcestershire, England. In 2021, the town had a population of 81,637 and the district had a population of 87,037. In the 1800s, it became a centre for the needle and fishing tackle industry; by the end of the century, 90% of the world's needles were manufactured in the town and its surrounding areas.

In the 1960s, it became part of the new town planning movement which included it expanding into neighbouring villages and hamlets surrounding the town. It is the second largest settlement in Worcestershire, after Worcester.

== History ==
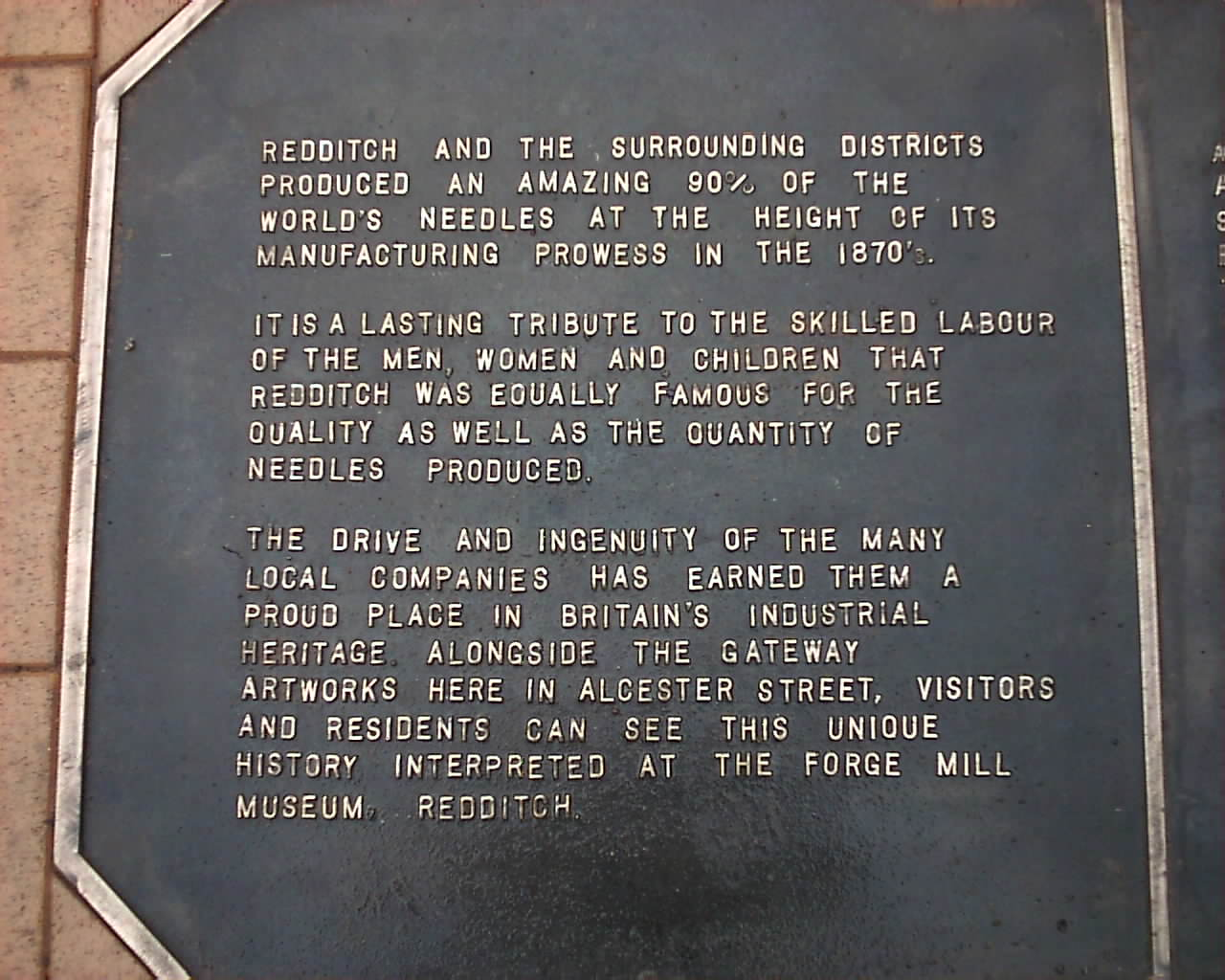
Commemorative pavement plaque in Alcester Street

The first recorded mention of Redditch (La Rededich, thought to be a reference to the red clay of the nearby River Arrow) is in 1348, the year of the outbreak of the Black Death. During the Middle Ages, it became a centre of needle-making and later prominent industries were fish-hooks, fishing tackle, motorcycles and springs, the last of which was notably undertaken by Herbert Terry and Sons. Redditch was designated a new town on 10 April 1964, and the population increased dramatically from 32,000 in 1964 to over 70,000 by 1984. Housing developments such as Church Hill, Matchborough, Winyates, Greenlands, and Woodrow were created to accommodate a large overspill from the industrially expanding Birmingham. Redditch was built as a "flagship" town using new methods and new town planning: all the main roads (mostly new dual carriageways as well as a ring road for the town centre) were banked to reduce noise to the new housing estates, and the whole of Redditch was landscaped. Historically, much of present-day Redditch was located within Warwickshire, but it is now in its entirety administered as a part of Worcestershire.

By the 21st century, needle-making and other traditional industries had been replaced by modern light industry and services, with Redditch also functioning as a dormitory town for Birmingham. The automotive retailer Halfords and engineering company GKN both have their headquarters in Redditch. Manufacturer of precious metal contacts, Samuel Taylor Ltd, has manufacturing plants within the town. Following the redevelopment of the flagship Kingfisher Shopping Centre in 2002, Redditch is undergoing an economic and cultural renaissance.

The town is home to several historical sites. The Forge Mill Needle Museum and the ruins of Bordesley Abbey are located in the north of the town, and the remains of a medieval moated settlement called Moons Moat are within the Church Hill estate.

== Governance ==
There are two main tiers of local government covering Redditch, at district and county level: Redditch Borough Council and Worcestershire County Council. The borough council is based at Redditch Town Hall on Walter Stranz Square, which was purpose-built for the council and opened in 1982.

The borough contains just one civil parish at Feckenham, in the more rural south-western part of the borough. The rest of the borough is an unparished area.

Under current local government reorganisation plans, all district councils in Worcestershire, as well as the county council, will be abolished in 2028, with the district forming part of a new North Worcestershire unitary authority, also including the area of the Bromsgrove and Wyre Forest districts.

The parliamentary constituency of Redditch is represented by Chris Bloore of the Labour Party, elected at the 2024 general election.

== Geography ==
Redditch is south of the West Midlands urban area. It is north of Evesham on the A435, which skirts it to the east. The main access routes are the A441 via junction 2 of the M42 Motorway, the A435 from junction 3 of the M42 and the A448 via junctions 4 or 5 of the M5. The Roman Road known as Icknield Street is prominent, running north to south through the eastern side of the town.

=== Districts of Redditch ===
The Borough of Redditch is divided into several districts. To the south and east of the town are "New Town Districts" built in the 1970s and 1980s. To the west of the Borough are older "Former Village Districts" that dominate the south and west, such as Webheath and Headless Cross.

See: Districts of Redditch

Since 2011, Redditch has participated in the Greater Birmingham & Solihull Local Enterprise Partnership along with neighbouring authorities Birmingham, Bromsgrove, Cannock Chase, East Staffordshire, Lichfield, Solihull, Tamworth and Wyre Forest.

=== Green belt ===
Redditch is within a green belt region that extends into the wider surrounding counties, and is in place to reduce urban sprawl, prevent further convergence between the towns surrounding the West Midlands conurbations of Birmingham and Coventry, protect the identity of outlying communities, encourage brownfield reuse and preserve nearby countryside. This is achieved by restricting inappropriate development within the designated areas, and imposing stricter conditions on permitted building.

The main urban area up to the Webheath, Walkwood, and Hunt End suburbs, Astwood Bank, and the southernmost extent of the borough are exempt from the green belt area, bar small adjacent green belt 'wedges', but surrounding smaller villages, hamlets and rural areas such as Feckenham, Littleworth, Old Yarr and Ham Green up to the B4090 Salt Way road are 'washed over' by the designation. The green belt was first drawn up under Worcestershire County Council, and the size in the borough in 2017 amounted to some 1,800 hectares (18 km^{2}; 6.9 sq mi).

== Transport ==
The M42 motorway is a short drive away and it is linked by dual carriageways and A-class roads to surrounding towns such as Bromsgrove and Evesham. There are regular bus services to Bromsgrove, Kidderminster, Studley and Stratford-upon-Avon.

=== Railway ===
Redditch railway station is one of the southern termini of the Cross-City Line, and provides a regular train service to Four Oaks via Birmingham New Street, which serves to Lichfield Trent Valley on Sundays. The station, and all trains serving it, are operated by West Midlands Railway.

Redditch railway station was first opened as the terminus of the Redditch Railway on 19 September 1859, alongside what is now Clive Road. This first station stayed until 4 May 1868 when the last section from Alcester to Redditch of the Redditch and Evesham Railway was closed, at which point a second station was built alongside the junction of Bromsgrove Road and Plymouth Road. This station was provided with a standard Midland Railway design and two platforms. The current station was built in 1993.

=== Buses ===
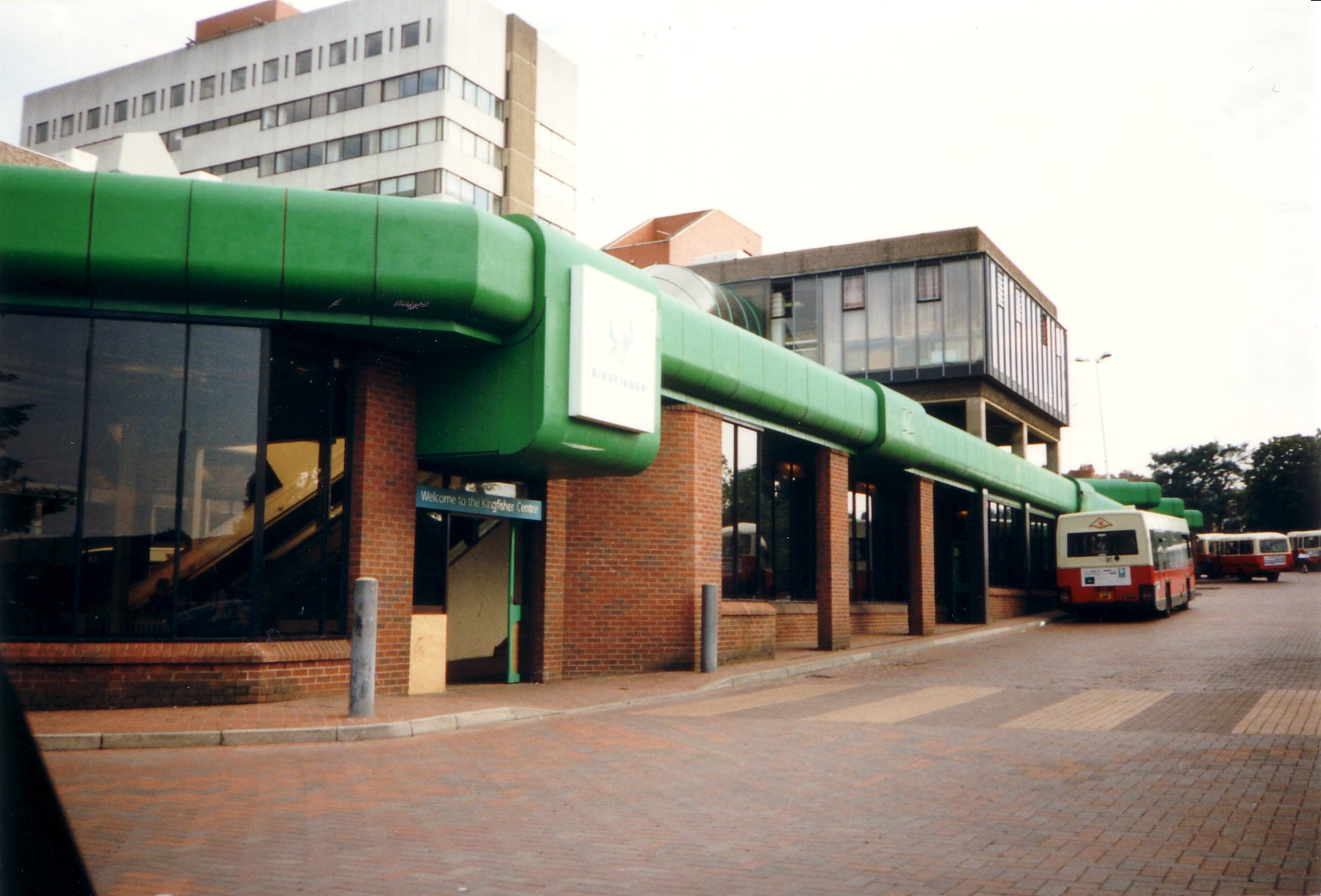
The former Redditch Bus Station, c. 1996

There is an extensive network of local bus services run by Diamond West Midlands and other operators (including Stagecoach and a community run bus). Most services run from the bus station in the town centre. The bus station was rebuilt as part of the 2002 shopping centre expansion.

Some areas of Redditch have dedicated bus routes; however, there have been issues with safety on these routes.

=== Road system ===
Redditch is occasionally noted for its confusing road system, dominated by a system of dual carriageways built when it became a New Town, including the only cloverleaf interchange in England at the junction of the A441 and the Bromsgrove-bound A448. The system is designed to allow rapid flow of large volumes of traffic around the various districts and into the town centre, whilst keeping fast moving vehicles separated from residential streets. This self-similar pattern is found on a smaller scale in many of the modern estates in the town, which follow a Radburn style of planned community.

Redditch gained media attention via The Graham Norton Show, for a tongue-in-cheek calendar called Roundabouts of Redditch, featuring its "picturesque" roundabouts created by a local printing company.

== Education ==
Redditch is one of the few areas of the country where the three-tier system of first, middle and high schools still exists. Students attend first school from the age of four, middle school from the age of nine and high school at the age of 13. Other areas of Worcestershire adopted this system at the same time as Redditch (in the 1970s), but many have reverted to the traditional 5–7 infant, 7–11 junior and 11-16/18 secondary schools.

Redditch currently has four high schools (RSA Academy Arrow Vale, Saint Augustine's Catholic High School, Tudor Grange Academy, Trinity High School) and six middle schools.

Heart of Worcestershire College (often referred to locally as "HOW College") is a large general further education college: one of its four campuses is in central Redditch; the other three are in Bromsgrove, Worcester and Malvern. The closest university is the University of Birmingham, 12.5 miles (20 km) to the north.

== Media ==
Local news and television programmes are provided by BBC West Midlands and ITV Central. Television signals are received from the Sutton Coldfield transmitter.

Local radio stations are BBC Hereford and Worcester, Heart West Midlands, Radio Wyvern, Capital Mid-Counties, Greatest Hits Radio Midlands, Hits Radio Herefordshire & Worcestershire and Smooth West Midlands.

Redditch's local newspapers are The Redditch Standard and The Redditch Advertiser.

== Amenities ==
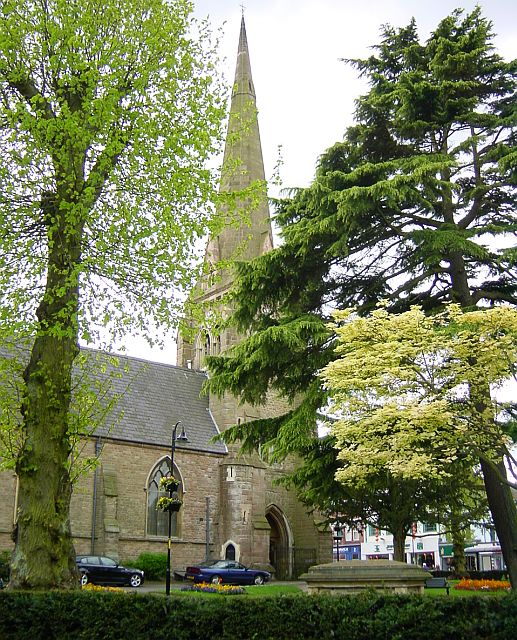
St Stephen's Church (Church of England)

Since June 2013, the swimming pool at Abbey Stadium Leisure Centre has been warmed using waste heat from the nearby Redditch Crematorium, in a scheme designed to save around £15,000 a year.

== In popular culture ==
The 2012 film Sightseers is partly set in Redditch. The 2018 film The Snarling used Redditch as one of its main filming locations.

Redditch is featured in a section heading in An Utterly Impartial History of Britain by John O'Farrell.

Birmingham and national TV comedian Jasper Carrott makes Redditch a repeated butt of his jokes, for example over the difficulty of escaping the Redditch ring road.

There is a listed theatre in Redditch called the Palace Theatre.

== Places of interest ==
Redditch Landmarks

- Bordesley Abbey: remains of a former Cistercian abbey, later used as a Royal Swannery.
- Forge Mill Needle Museum: exhibition of traditional needle making.
- Redditch Library: the second-largest library in Worcestershire which attracts up to 12,500 visitors a month.

=== Kingfisher Shopping Centre ===
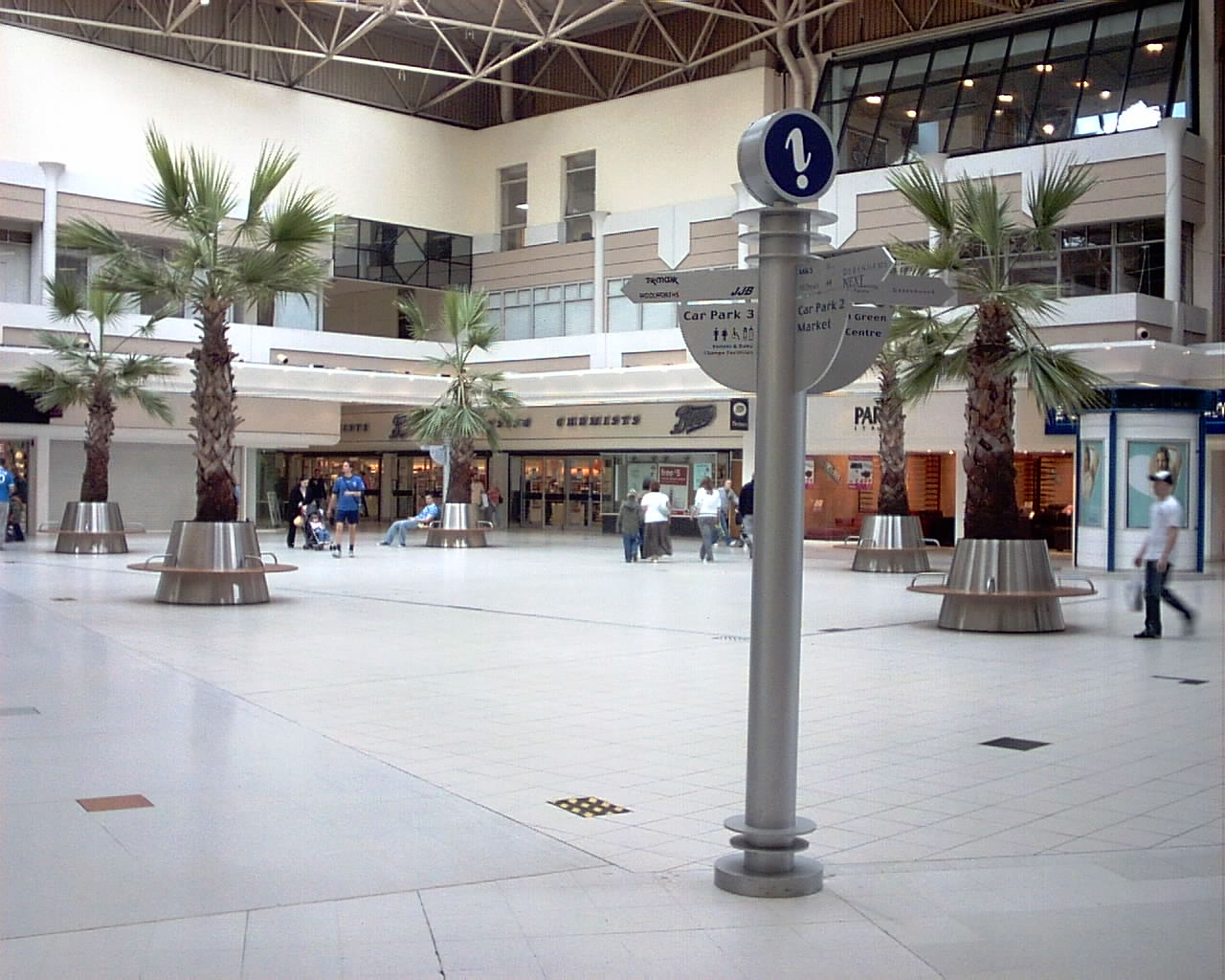
Worcester Square

Kingfisher Shopping Centre was opened in 1976 by the then Prime Minister James Callaghan and now forms the town's primary retail centre.

The centre has over 1,100,000 square feet (100,000 m^{2}) of retail space. It is one of the largest covered shopping centres in the United Kingdom.

=== Arrow Valley Country Park ===
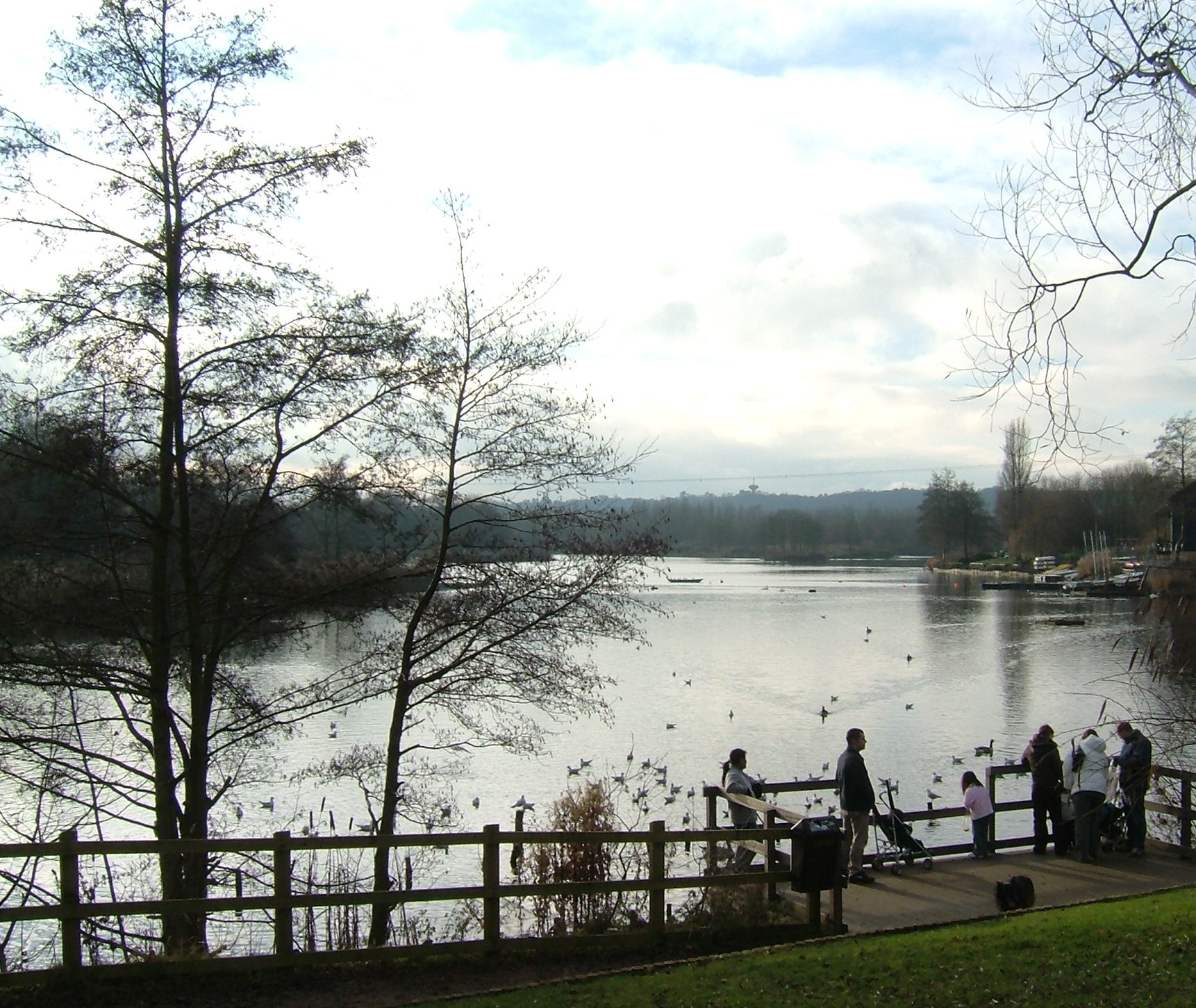
View across Arrow Valley Lake

Redditch has 900 acres (3.6 km^{2}) of public open space in Arrow Valley Country Park. This incorporates the 30-acre (120,000 m^{2}) Arrow Valley Lake, fed by the River Arrow. The park incorporates a Local Nature Reserve, Proctor's Barn Meadow. The Arrow Valley Countryside centre, opened in 2000 in the Country Park, has a lakeside café, gift shop and an interactive exhibition. The lake is also used for water sports. There are four waymarked trails for walking and cycling around the lake and through the Country Park. There is a skate park in the south of the park with walks along the river Arrow through the Country Park to the Forge Mill Museum in the north. There are interactive events and family activities at the Countryside Centre and a comprehensive children's play area.

=== Royal Enfield motorcycles ===
Redditch was the home of the Royal Enfield motorcycle. This is where the main factory of the original company was located and the business continued manufacturing until the 1960s, the last model being the Interceptor. The Redditch factory was closed in 1967 and production was moved to the Bradford on Avon factory, which closed in 1970, ending English Enfield manufacturing.

In the mid 1950s, the company established a partner, Madras Motors, in Madras, India, who manufactured the Bullet 350 model. Some of the original factory buildings in Redditch still remain, most are in a derelict state and can be seen from Hewell Road.

== Notable people ==
- Josh Baker (2003–2024), cricketer, born in Redditch
- John Bonham (1948–1980), drummer with Led Zeppelin, was born in Redditch and attended Lodge Farm Secondary Modern School
- Lionel Britton (1887–1971), novelist and writer of science fiction plays was born at Astwood Bank now a suburb of Redditch
- Russell Brookes (born 1945), British rally champion
- Nigel Clark from band Dodgy grew up in Redditch and went to The Leys High school, now Tudor Grange Academy Redditch
- Charlie Clemmow, soap actress who is best known for her role as Imogen Hollins in the BBC soap, Doctors. She grew up in Astwood Bank
- Stacy Coldicott (born 1974), footballer, West Bromwich Albion and Grimsby Town was born in Redditch
- Charles Dance (born 1946), actor, born in Redditch
- Jimmy Davis (1982–2003), footballer, Manchester United, Swindon Town and Watford was born in Bromsgrove, but his funeral took place at Redditch Crematorium
- Jonathan Dow, actor was born in Redditch
- Ruth England (born 1970), TV presenter, educated in Redditch
- Robin Field, composer, born in Redditch in 1935
- Felix Gill (born 2002), professional tennis player
- Luke Johnson, musician, Lostprophets was born in Redditch
- Antony Johnston, author, was raised in Redditch
- Zoë Lister, actor Hollyoaks trained at the Starlight School of Dance in Winyates, Redditch
- Joe Lolley, footballer, Nottingham Forest, Huddersfield Town and Kidderminster Harriers was born in Redditch
- Tony Martin (born 1957), singer, Black Sabbath frontman 1987–1991, 1994–1997
- Tom Paddock (1822–1863) was born in Redditch, and known as the "Redditch Needlepointer", champion heavyweight bare-knuckle boxer of England in 1856
- Nathanael Saleh, actor born in Redditch in 2006
- Jacqui Smith, former MP for Redditch and first female British Home Secretary
- Freddie Starr (1943–2019), comedian, impressionist, singer and actor, lived in Mappleborough Green, just outside Redditch
- Alan Styler, (1925–1970) D'Oyly Carte Opera Company baritone, 1947–1968 was born and raised in Redditch
- Harry Styles (born 1994) born in Redditch. Raised in Holmes Chapel. Singer, songwriter and actor. Member of boy band One Direction, 3 time Grammy winner.
- John Taylor (born 1960), musician, Duran Duran, went to Abbey High School in Redditch
- Raymond Thompson, scriptwriter and TV producer, born in Redditch. Creator of hit New Zealand teen/sci-fi television series The Tribe
- Lorna Rose Treen (born 1994), comedian and winner of the 2023 Funniest Joke of the Fringe, grew up in Redditch
- Archer Windsor-Clive (1890–1914), cricketer
- Josh Tongue (born 1997), cricketer

== Town twinning ==
In 1956, Redditch was twinned with Auxerre in Burgundy, France. This twinning proved sufficiently popular to form an organisation named The Friends of Auxerre (FoA). At the beginning of June each year the coupling of these two towns is officially celebrated.

In 1986, Redditch was twinned with Mtwara in Tanzania. Frequent events are organised with assistance from the community of Tanzanian students at Birmingham University and Selly Oak College.

- Auxerre, France
- Mtwara, Tanzania

=== Friendship links ===
Redditch also has formal "Friendship" links with:

- St. Elizabeth, Jamaica, West Indies
- Gruchet-le-Valasse, France
- Gujar Khan, Pakistan

== Sport ==
Redditch sport teams include:

- Redditch United F.C. playing Football in the Southern League Premier Division Central
- Redditch Borough F.C. playing Football in the Hellenic League Division One
- NEW Ravens playing Rugby league in the Midlands Rugby League Premier Division
- Redditch RFC playing Rugby Union in the Midlands 4 West (South)
- Redditch CC playing Cricket in the Worcestershire County Cricket League
- Redditch Arrows American football Team
- Longmeadow Redditch Badminton Club playing Badminton with 8 teams in the Worcestershire and Solihull Leagues.
- Redditch Roller Sports Club Roller Derby and Recretational Roller Skating Instruction
- Bromsgrove and Redditch Athletic Club
- Redditch Rockets Skater Hockey Club
- Redditch Swimming Club
- The Redditch Road and Path Cycling Club

== Climate ==
Redditch has an oceanic climate (Köppen climate classification Cfb) similar to almost all of the United Kingdom.

Climate data for Redditch
Month	Jan	Feb	Mar	Apr	May	Jun	Jul	Aug	Sep	Oct	Nov	Dec	Year
Mean daily maximum °C (°F)	7 (45)	7 (45)	10 (50)	13 (55)	16 (61)	19 (66)	21 (70)	21 (70)	18 (64)	14 (57)	10 (50)	8 (46)	14 (57)
Mean daily minimum °C (°F)	2 (36)	1 (34)	3 (37)	4 (39)	7 (45)	10 (50)	12 (54)	12 (54)	10 (50)	7 (45)	4 (39)	2 (36)	6 (43)
Average precipitation mm (inches)	71.4 (2.81)	50.8 (2.00)	58 (2.3)	58 (2.3)	53.5 (2.11)	58 (2.3)	50 (2.0)	67.7 (2.67)	61.8 (2.43)	70.0 (2.76)	71.0 (2.80)	75.1 (2.96)	745.3 (29.44)
Average precipitation days	12	9	11	10	9	9	8	9	9	11	11	11	119
Source: NOAA

== See also ==
- Districts of Redditch
- Redditch Borough Council
