= Worcester College, Oxford =

College of the University of Oxford

Worcester College
- University of Oxford
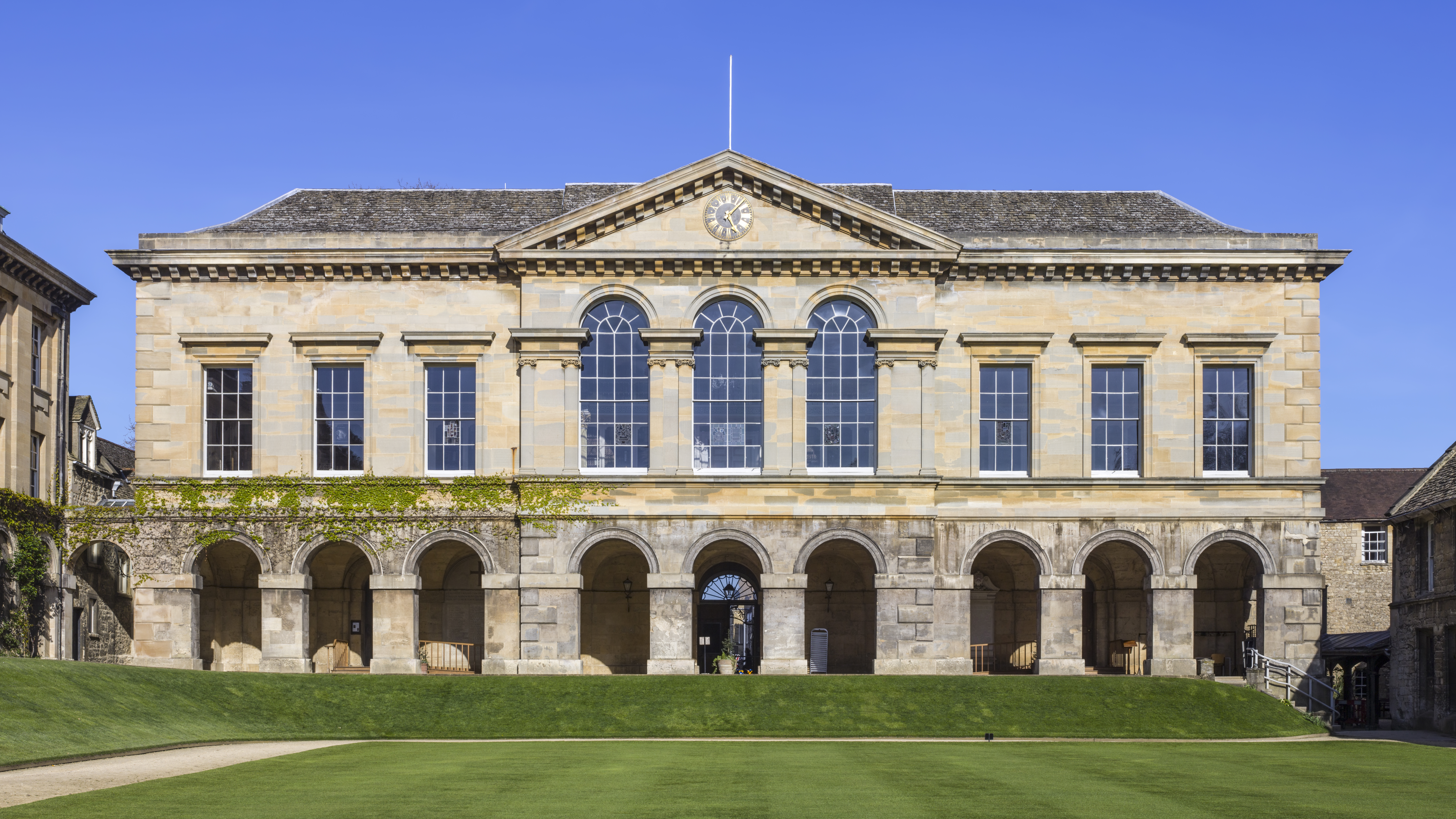
- East side of Main Quad

- Arms: Argent, two chevronels gules between six martlets, three, two and one sable (modified arms of Cookes)
Scarf colours: black, with two equally-spaced pearl-pink stripes
- Location: Worcester Street
- Coordinates: 51.754971°N 1.263701°W
- Full name: Worcester College in the University of Oxford
- Latin name: Collegium Vigorniense
- Established: 1283; 743 years ago as Gloucester College, 1560; 466 years ago as Gloucester Hall, 1714; 312 years ago as Worcester College
- Named for: Sir Thomas Cookes, Worcestershire
- Former names: Gloucester College, Gloucester Hall
- Architect: Nicholas Hawksmoor James Wyatt William Burges
- Sister college: St Catharine's College, Cambridge
- Provost: David Isaac, CBE
- Undergraduates: 412 (2011/2012)
- Postgraduates: 167
- Endowment: £64.5 million (2025)
- Visitor: The Master of the Rolls
- Website: www.worc.ox.ac.uk
- Boat club: Worcester College Boat Club

Map
- Location within Oxford city centre

Worcester College (/ˈwʊstər/ WUUST-ər) is a constituent college of the University of Oxford in England. The college was founded in 1714 by the benefaction of Sir Thomas Cookes, 2nd Baronet (1648–1701) of Norgrove, Worcestershire, whose coat of arms was adopted by the college. Its predecessor, Gloucester College, had been an institution of learning on the same site since the late 13th century until the Dissolution of the Monasteries in 1539. Founded as a men's college, Worcester has been coeducational since 1979. The provost is David Isaac, who took office on 1 July 2021.

As of 2025, Worcester College had a financial endowment of £64.587 million.

Notable alumni of the college include the media mogul Rupert Murdoch, television producer and screenwriter Russell T Davies, US Supreme Court justice Elena Kagan, Fields medallist Simon Donaldson, novelist Richard Adams (author of Watership Down), professional basketball player and US Senator Bill Bradley, and the Sultan of Perak, Nazrin Shah.

== Buildings and grounds ==
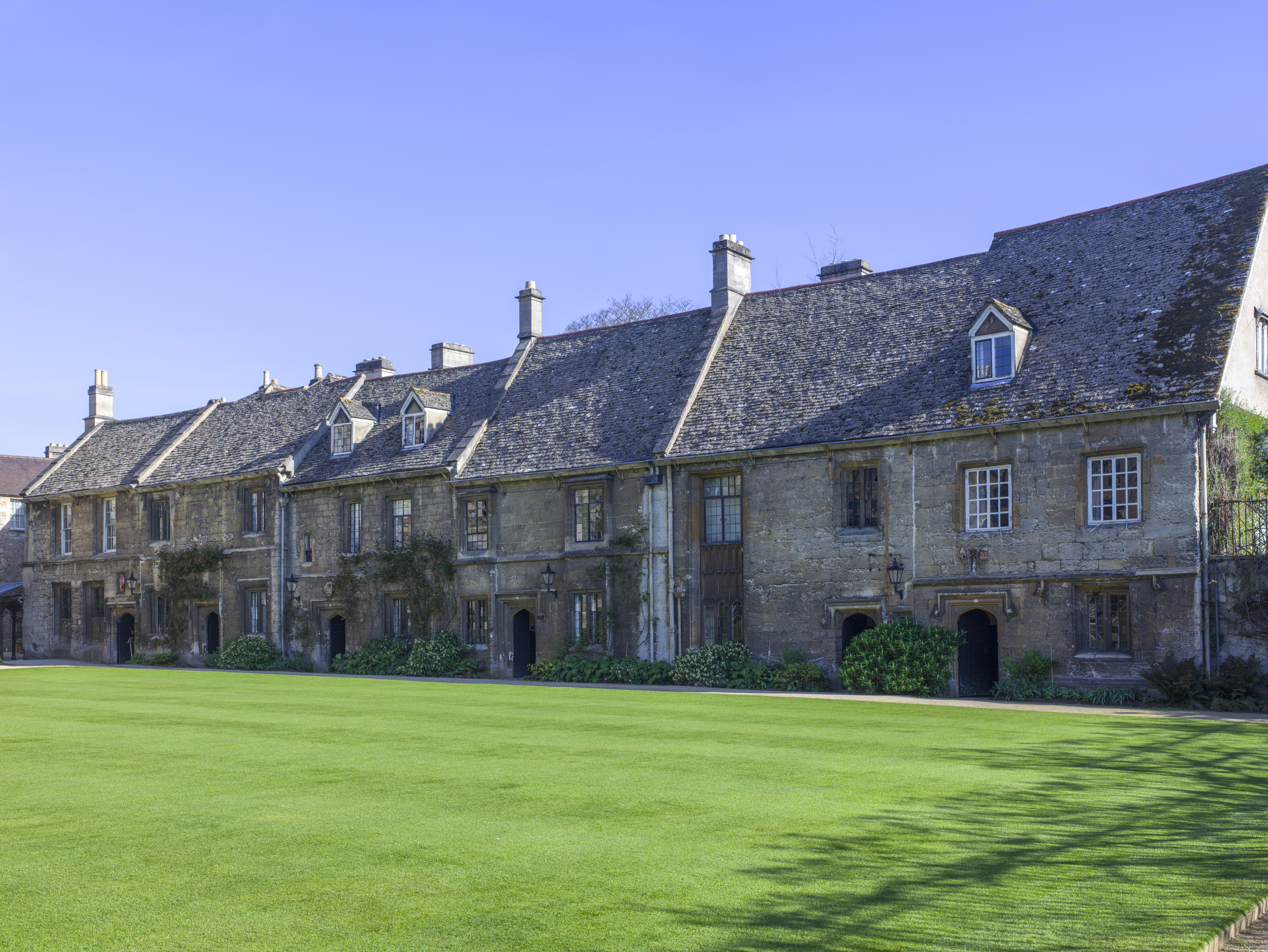
Front view of medieval cottages.

The buildings are diverse, especially in the main quadrangle: looking down into the main quadrangle from the entrance through the main building, to the right is an imposing 18th-century building in the neo-classical style; and to the left a row of medieval buildings known as "the cottages", which are among the oldest residential buildings in Oxford. These cottages are the most substantial surviving part of Gloucester College, Worcester's predecessor on the same site: this was a college for Benedictine monks, founded in 1283 and dissolved with the Dissolution of the Monasteries in about 1539.

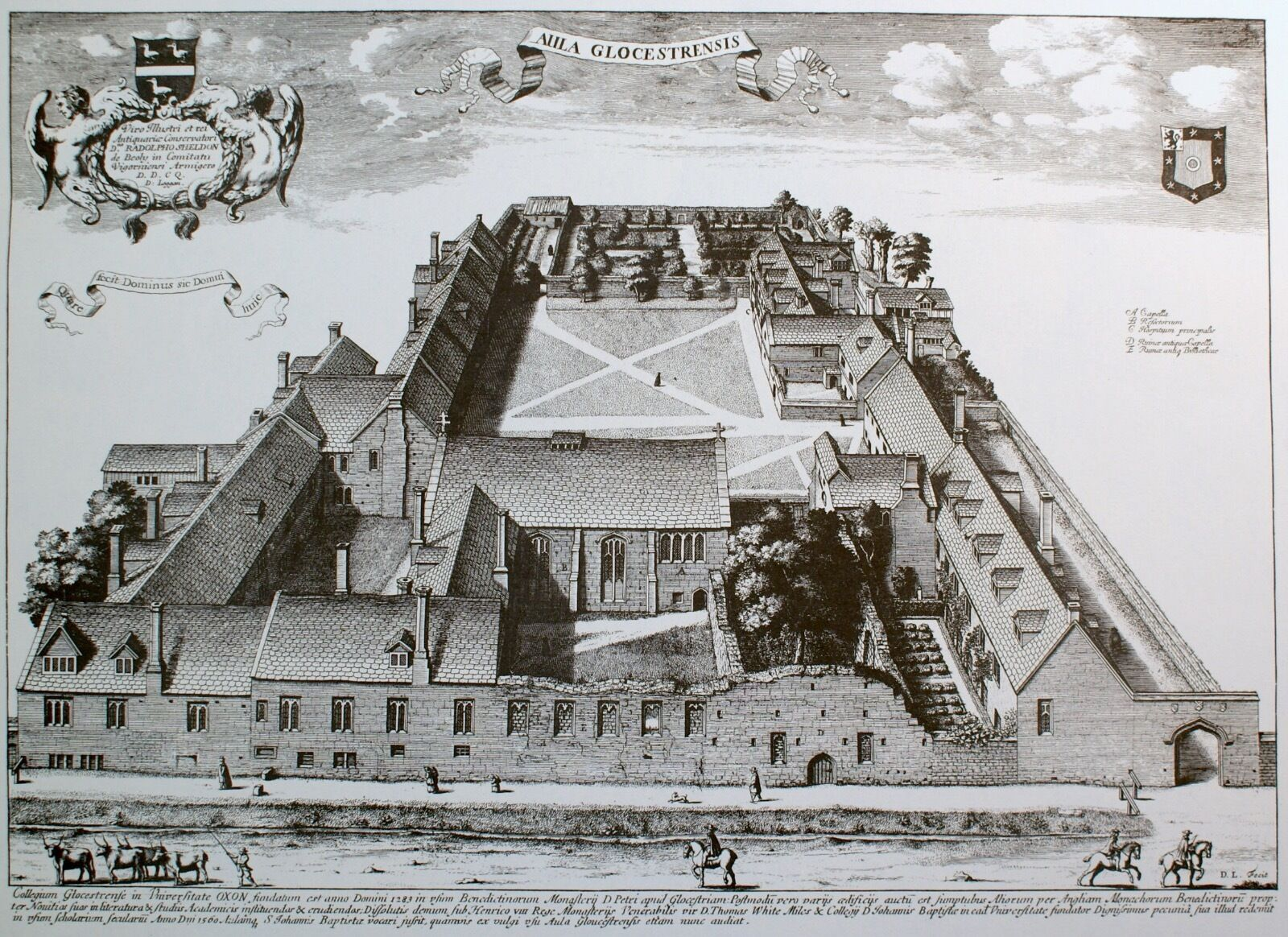
Gloucester Hall in 1675, housed largely in the surviving buildings of Gloucester College

After a lapse of 20 years, the buildings of the old Gloucester College were used in the foundation of an academic hall, Gloucester Hall, in around 1560. The penultimate principal, Benjamin Woodroffe, attempted to establish there a 'Greek College' for Greek Orthodox students to come to Oxford, part of a scheme to make ecumenical links with the Church of England. This was a going concern from 1699 to 1705, although only 15 Greeks are recorded as members.

In 1714, thanks to a fortunate benefaction from a Worcestershire baronet, Sir Thomas Cookes, Gloucester Hall was transformed into Worcester College. Even then, there were only sufficient funds to rebuild the Chapel, Hall and Library and the north side of the Front Quad, known as the Terrace. The designs were by George Clarke, who had consulted Nicholas Hawksmoor.

In 1736, Clarke generously left to the college his great collection of books and manuscripts. These included the papers of his father William Clarke (which are of crucial importance for the history of England during the period of the Commonwealth and Protectorate) and a large proportion of the surviving drawings of Inigo Jones.

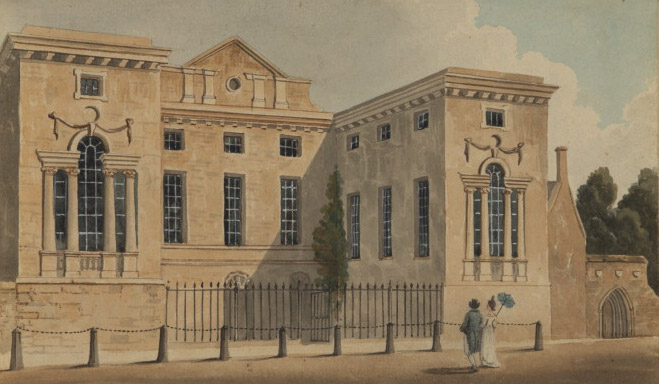
Worcester College in the early 19th century. The projecting wings are the Hall (left) and the Chapel (right)

Owing to lack of funds, Worcester's 18th-century building programme proceeded by fits and starts. The west end of the Terrace and the Provost's Lodgings were added in 1773–1776 (architect: Henry Keene). The medieval cottages were to have been replaced by a further classical range, but survived because money for this purpose was never available; the Hall and Chapel, by James Wyatt, were not completed until the 1770s.

=== The Chapel ===
The College Chapel was built in the 18th century. George Clarke, Henry Keene, and James Wyatt were responsible for different stages of its lengthy construction (1720–1791), owing to a shortage of funds. The interior columns and pilasters, the dome, and the delicate foliage plastering are all Wyatt's work. His classical interior was insufficiently emphatic for the tastes of militant Victorian churchmen, and between 1864 and 1866 the chapel was redecorated by William Burges. It is highly unusual and decorative; being predominantly pink, the pews are decorated with carved animals, including kangaroos and whales, and the walls are riotously colourful, and include frescoes of dodos and peacocks. Its stained glass windows were to have been designed by John Everett Millais, but Burges rejected his designs and entrusted the work to Henry Holiday. Oscar Wilde said of the Chapel, "As a piece of simple decorative and beautiful art it is perfect, and the windows very artistic."

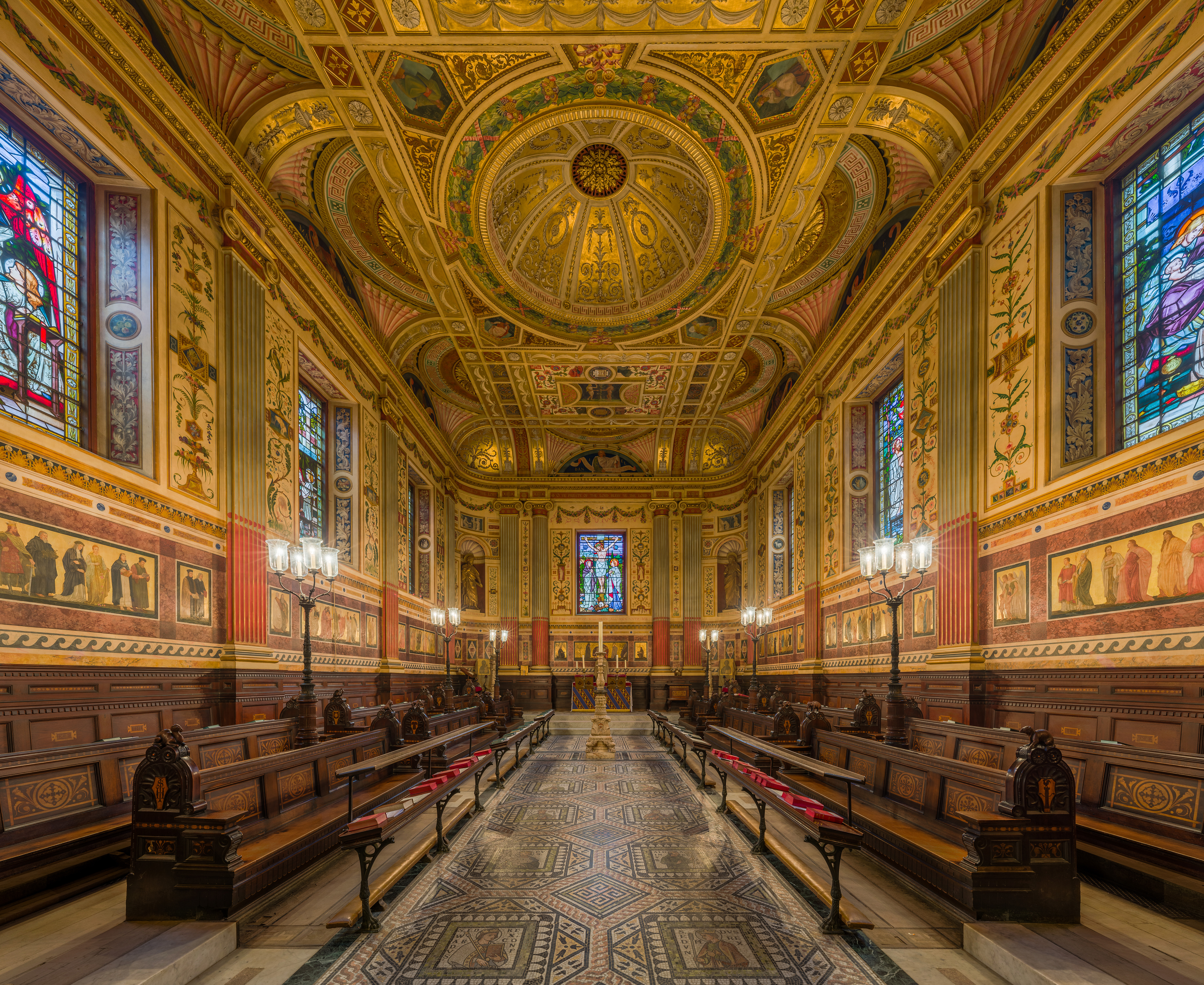
The interior of The Chapel

=== The Chapel Choirs ===
Worcester is unique among the Oxford colleges in that it has not one, but two chapel choirs of equal status, which share out the weekly services between them. There is a mixed-voice choir constituted of auditioned choral scholars and volunteers, which sings twice a week: weekly on Thursday and on alternating Sunday and Monday evenings. The Boys' Choir consists of trebles from Christ Church Cathedral School and alto, tenor and bass choral scholars. This choir also sings twice weekly; on Sunday and Tuesday evenings. These choirs are run on a day-to-day basis by Worcester's two Organ Scholars alongside the director of music.

=== The Hall ===
William Burges was commissioned to redecorate the Hall, but was forced to curtail his elaborate designs by a lack of funds. A reduced scheme was completed in 1877 but was substantially altered in the early-20th century, and in 1966 Wyatt's designs were restored using his original drawings (preserved in the College Library), under the direction of architect Emil Godfrey. The Hall was refurbished and redecorated in 2018.

"Exit Burges. [The college fellows] will be sorry in fifty years."

— Nikolaus Pevsner on the College Fellows' decision to remove Burges's work in the Hall and reinstate that of Wyatt.

=== Modern buildings ===
In more recent years, several new residential blocks for undergraduates and graduates have been added, thanks in part to a series of generous benefactions. The latest of these include the Earl Building, Sainsbury Building (which won the Civic Trust Award in 1984), Linbury Building, Canal Building, Ruskin Lane Building (for undergraduates), the Franks Building (for graduates), and the Sultan Nazrin Shah Centre, which won numerous architectural awards and was shortlisted for the 2018 Stirling Prize.

The Canal Building sits next to the north entrance to the college and, as the name suggests, beside the Oxford Canal. It houses 50 students in large en-suite single rooms. The accommodation is usually reserved for third and fourth-year undergraduates.

=== The Gardens ===
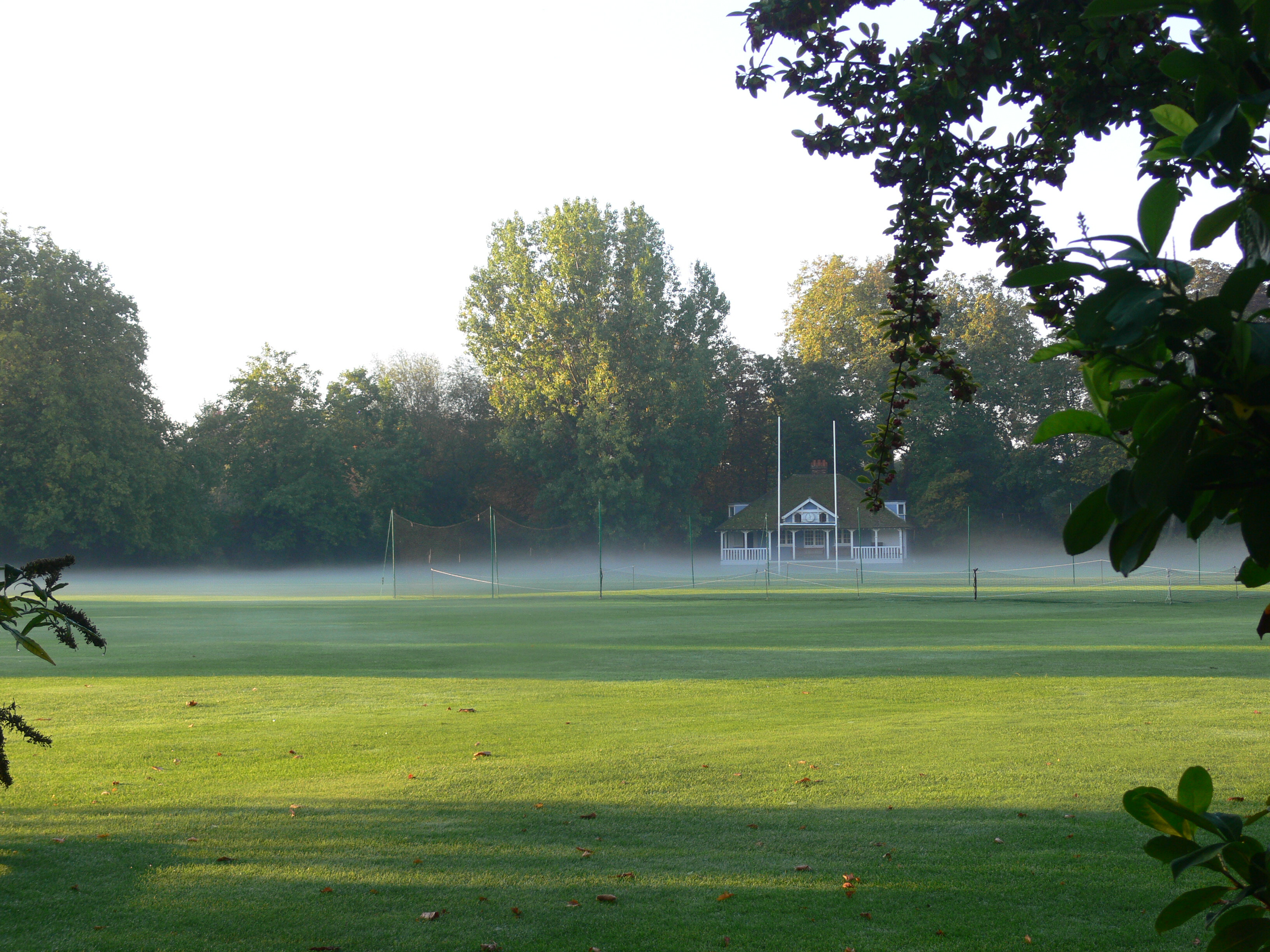
Worcester's playing fields

Although Worcester is near the centre of Oxford today, it was on the edge of the city in the 18th century. This has proved a benefit in the long run, since it has allowed the college to retain very extensive gardens and contiguous playing fields (a total of 26 acres or 11 hectares, including a lake).

The gardens have won numerous awards, including the Oxford in Bloom college award every time they have been entered for the competition. Extensive work on the gardens was carried out between 1817 and 1820, and they may have been laid out in the Picturesque style by Richard Greswell in 1827. They are now managed by head gardener Simon Bagnall and a team of seven gardeners.

A production of Twelfth Night was directed by Patrick Garland in the gardens with Oz Clarke as Sir Toby Belch and Francis Matthews. Other garden plays have included The Tempest on the lake, directed by Nevill Coghill in 1949, and Twelfth Night in the Provost's garden, directed by provost Jonathan Bate and undergraduate Georgia Figgis in 2016.

From February 2009 until December 2018 the college's gardeners kept a blog to provide an insight into the work involved in looking after the 26 acres (110,000 m^{2}).

=== Gallery ===
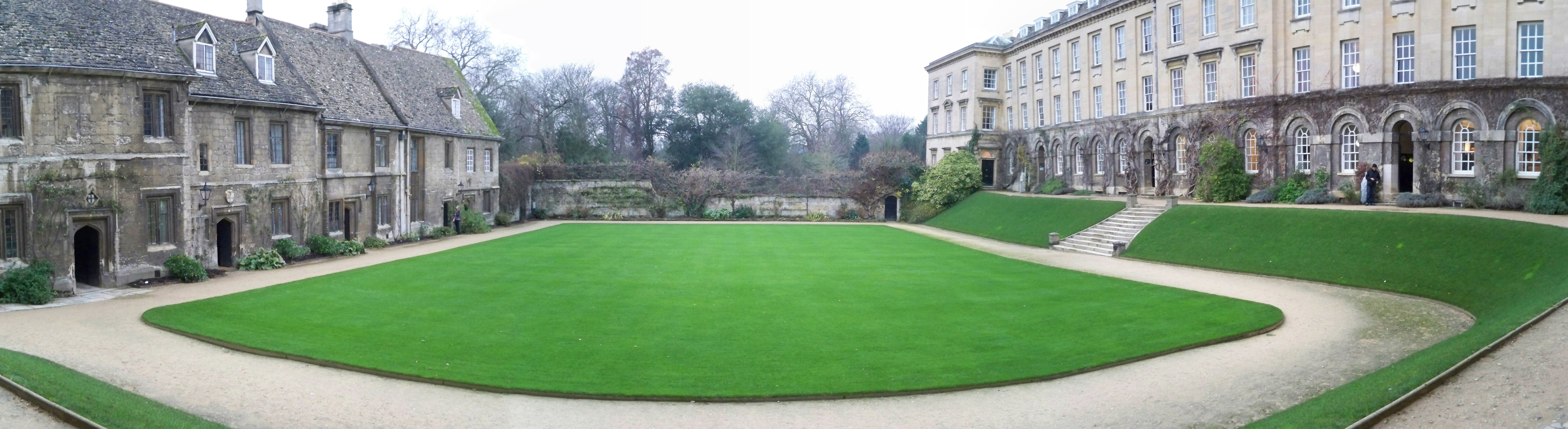
The main quadrangle of Worcester College; on the left are the medieval buildings known as "the cottages", the most substantial surviving part of Gloucester College, Worcester's predecessor

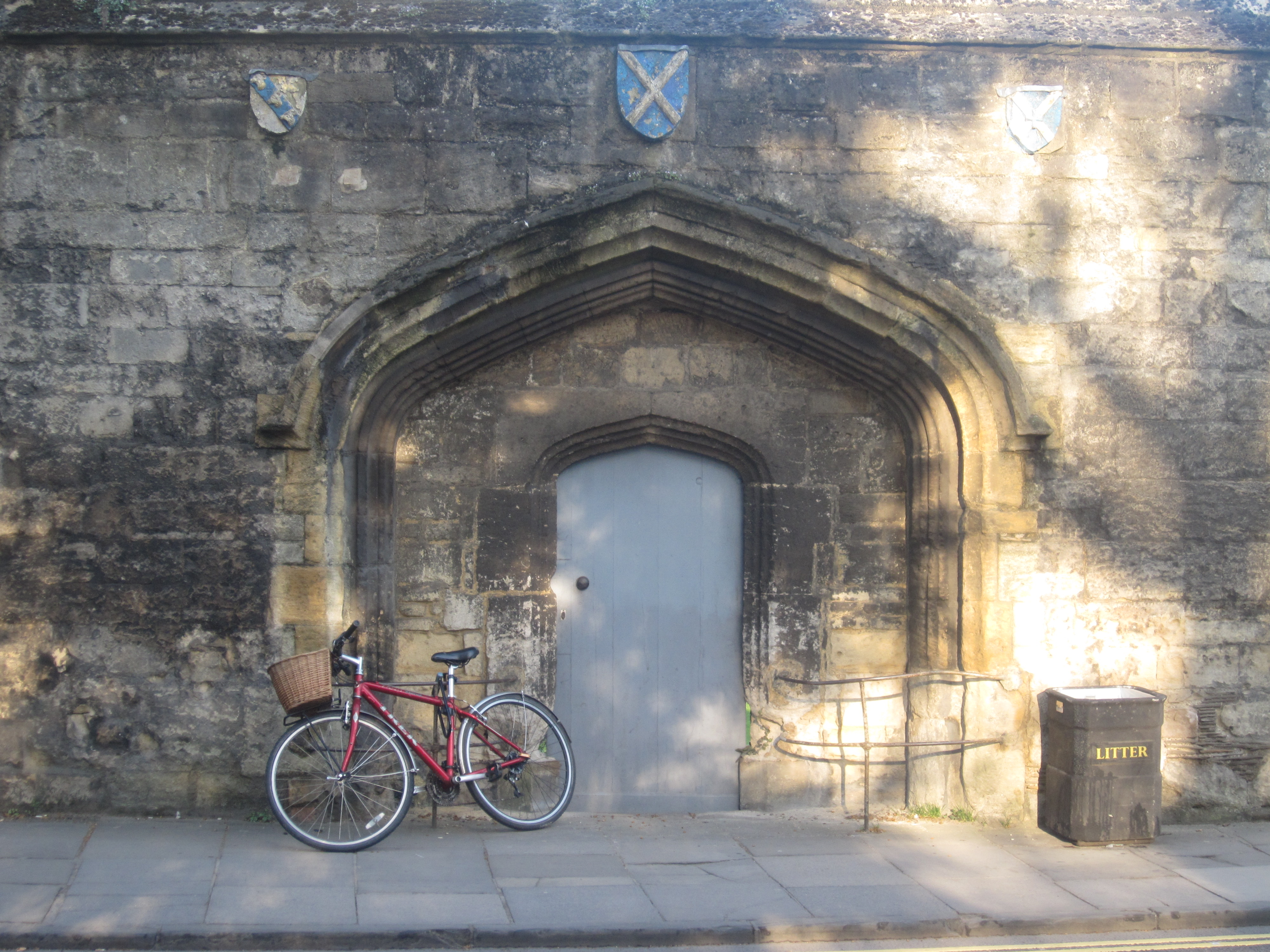
The 15th-century gate of Gloucester College, surviving to the side of the current gate and bearing the arms of the abbeys of Winchcombe, St Albans and Ramsey

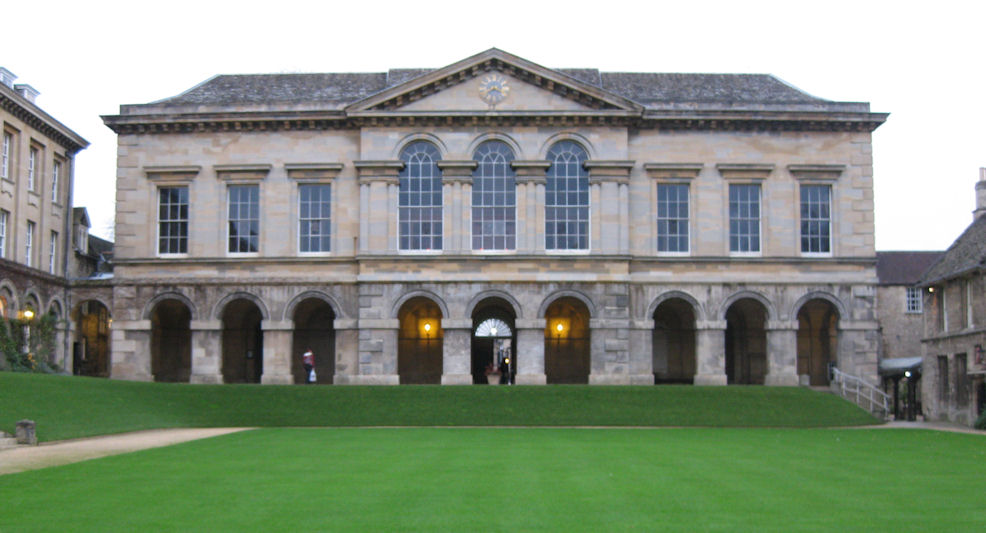
The main building rebuilt between 1720 and 1786. Above the arcade is the Old Library; behind the arcade are the main entrance to the College (centre) and the entrances to the Chapel (left) and the Hall (right)

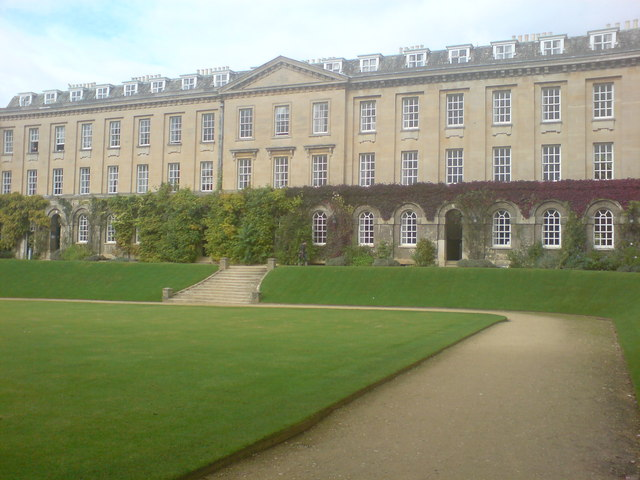
North range of the Quad, the 18th-century Terrace

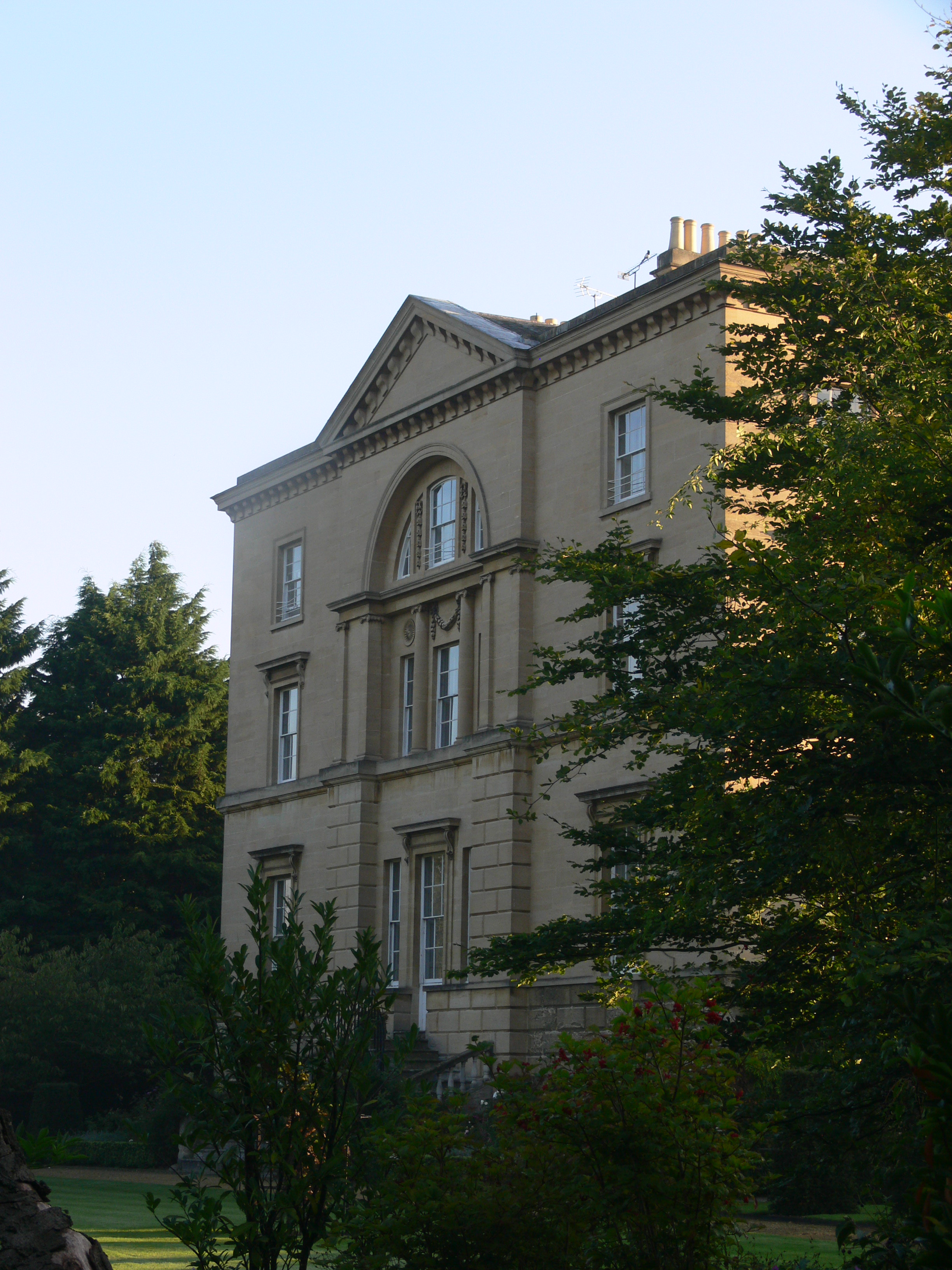
Provost's Lodgings, added to the North range in 1773–1776 by the architect Henry Keene

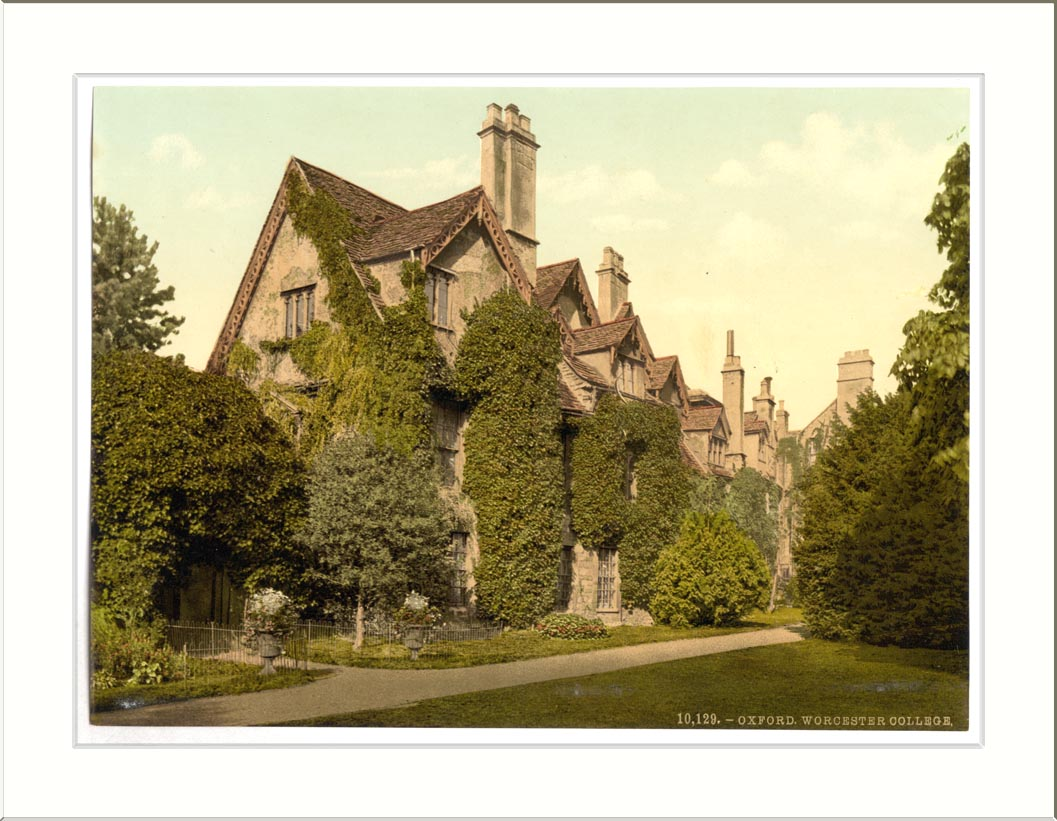
The cottages from the Nuffield lawn

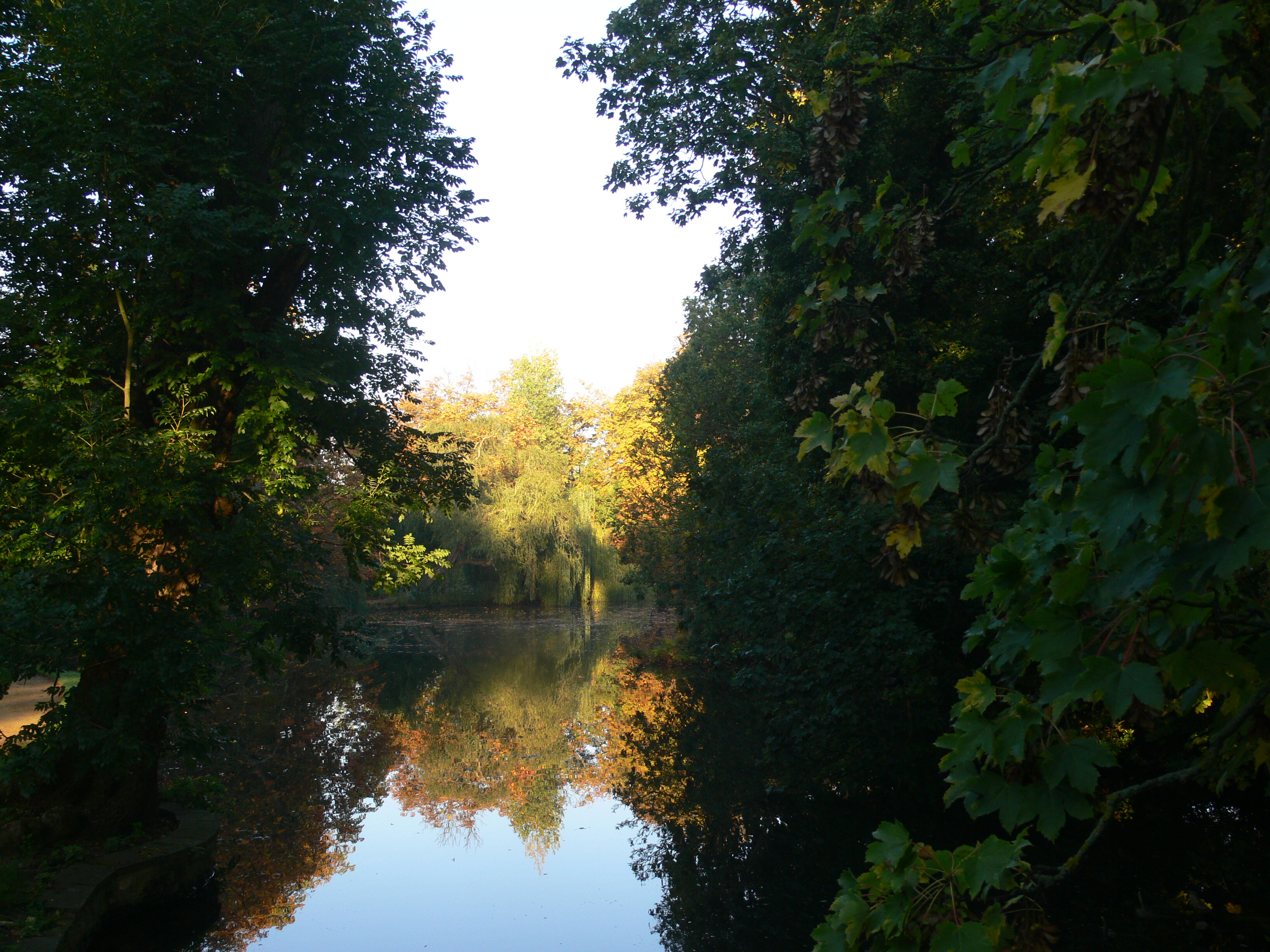
Lake

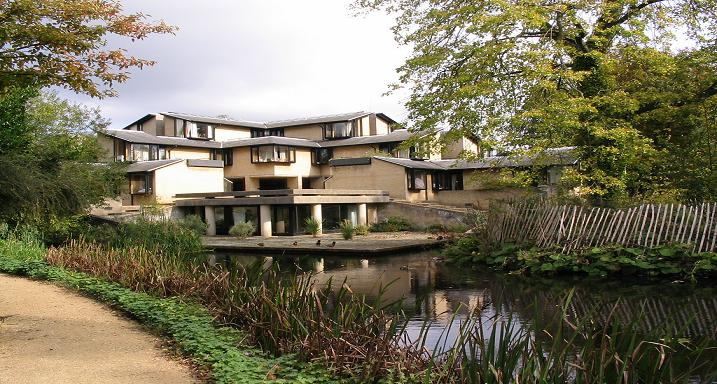
Sainsbury Building (which won the Civic Trust Award in 1984)

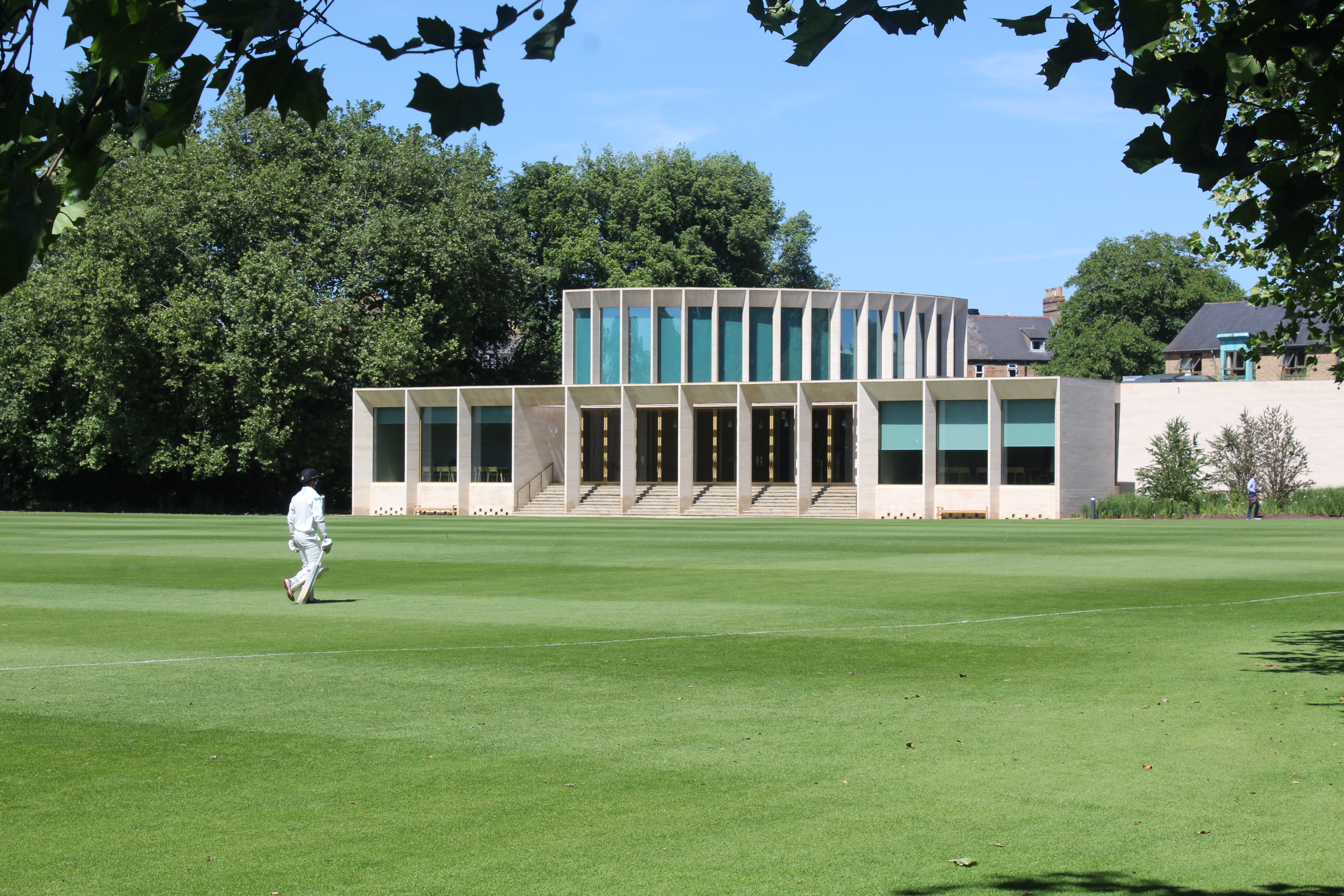
Sultan Nazrin Shah Centre, added in 2017, viewed across the cricket field

== Traditions ==
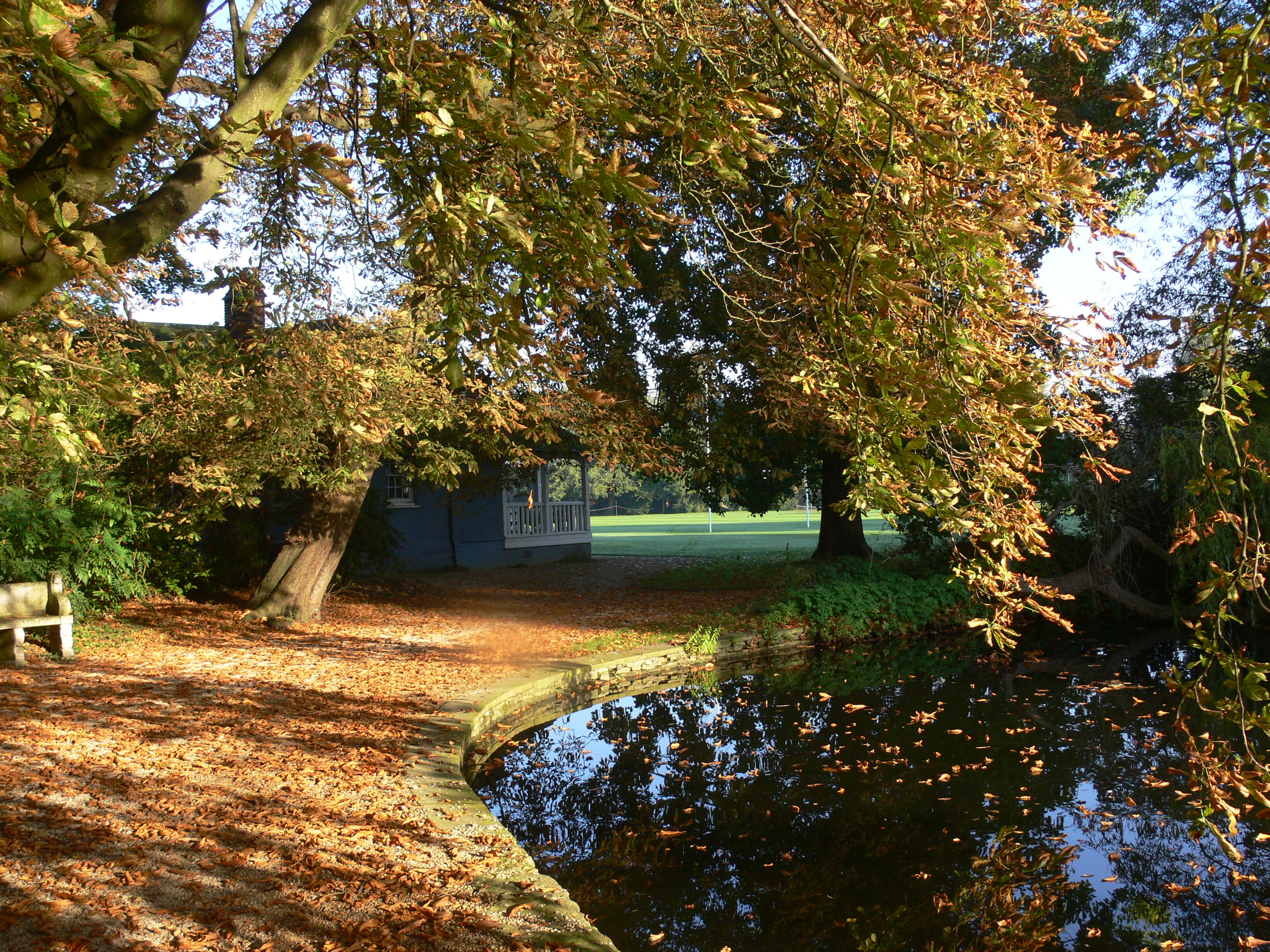
The lake and the playing field

Every three years in June, the college hosts a commemoration ball.

The College holds a Formal Hall on several days of the week; dress is formal with gowns compulsory for matriculated students. Before each meal, the college grace is recited by a scholar, or student studying a field related to Literae Humaniores. The text is the same as that recited at Christ Church but, in comparison, always given in the long form, in Latin:

"Nōs miserī hominēs et egēnī, prō cibīs quōs nōbis ad corporis subsidium benignē es largītus, tibi, Deus omnipotēns, Pater cælestis, grātiās reverenter agimus; simul obsecrantēs, ut iīs sobriē, modestē atque grātē ūtāmur. Īnsuper petimus, ut cibum angelōrum, vērum panem cælestem, verbum Deī æternum, Dominum nostrum Iēsum Christum, nōbis impertiāris; utque illō mēns nostra pascātur et per carnem et sanguinem eius fovēāmur, alāmur, et corrōborēmur. Amen."

Translated into English:

"We unhappy and unworthy men do give thee most reverent thanks, Almighty God, our heavenly Father, for the victuals which thou hast bestowed on us for the sustenance of the body, at the same time beseeching thee that we may use them soberly, modestly and gratefully. And above all we beseech thee to impart to us the food of angels, the true bread of heaven, the eternal Word of God, Jesus Christ our Lord, so that the mind of each of us may feed on him and that through his flesh and blood we may be sustained, nourished and strengthened. Amen."

Every Hilary (spring) term on the Saturday of 4th Week, second-year members of the College celebrate 'Midway' to mark the point at which they are exactly halfway through their degree (given that students on 3-year courses attend for nine terms, each lasting eight weeks). The occasion is marked with the taking of professional photographs: one in formal dress (but not gowns), and the other in costumes made by the students, usually reflecting themes decided by individual groups of friends. Later in the day, a meal is served in Formal Hall to distinguish the event.

== Sports ==
Worcester College is known for its sporting prowess, especially in football, cricket, and hockey, and is one of the few colleges to have its sporting grounds onsite (football, rugby, tennis, basketball, netball, croquet, and cricket). In the 2011/2012 season, Worcester won Men's and Women's Football Cuppers. During recent years the hockey side has won numerous league titles, 'Varsity Cuppers' or 'Supercuppers' in 2015, and Cuppers in 2016.. The Worcester College Boat Club was founded in 1825 and shares the boathouse building with Merton College Boat Club.

== People associated with Worcester ==
=== Provosts ===
- Richard Blechinden, 1714–1736
- William Gower, 1736–1777
- William Sheffield, 1777–1795
- Whittington Landon, 1795–1839
- Richard Lynch Cotton, 1839–1881
- William Inge, 1881–1903
- C. Henry Daniel, 1903–1919
- Francis John Lys, 1919–1946
- John Cecil Masterman, 1946–1962
- Oliver Franks, Baron Franks, 1962–1976
- Asa Briggs, Baron Briggs, 1976–1991
- Richard Smethurst, 1991–2011
- Sir Jonathan Bate, 2011–2019
- Kate Tunstall, Interim Provost 2019–21
- David Isaac, 1 July 2021–

=== Notable alumni ===
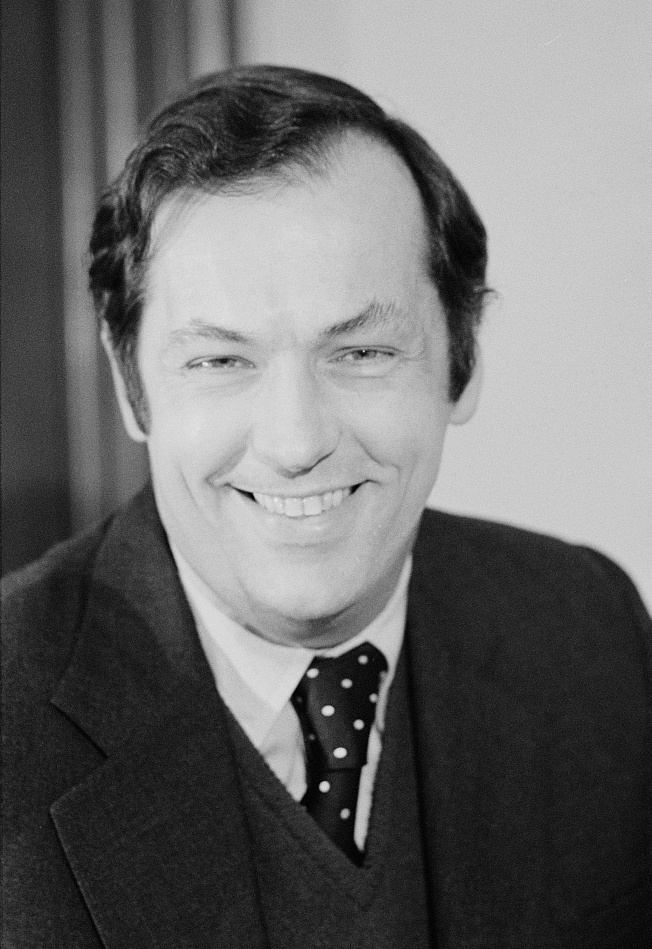
Bill Bradley

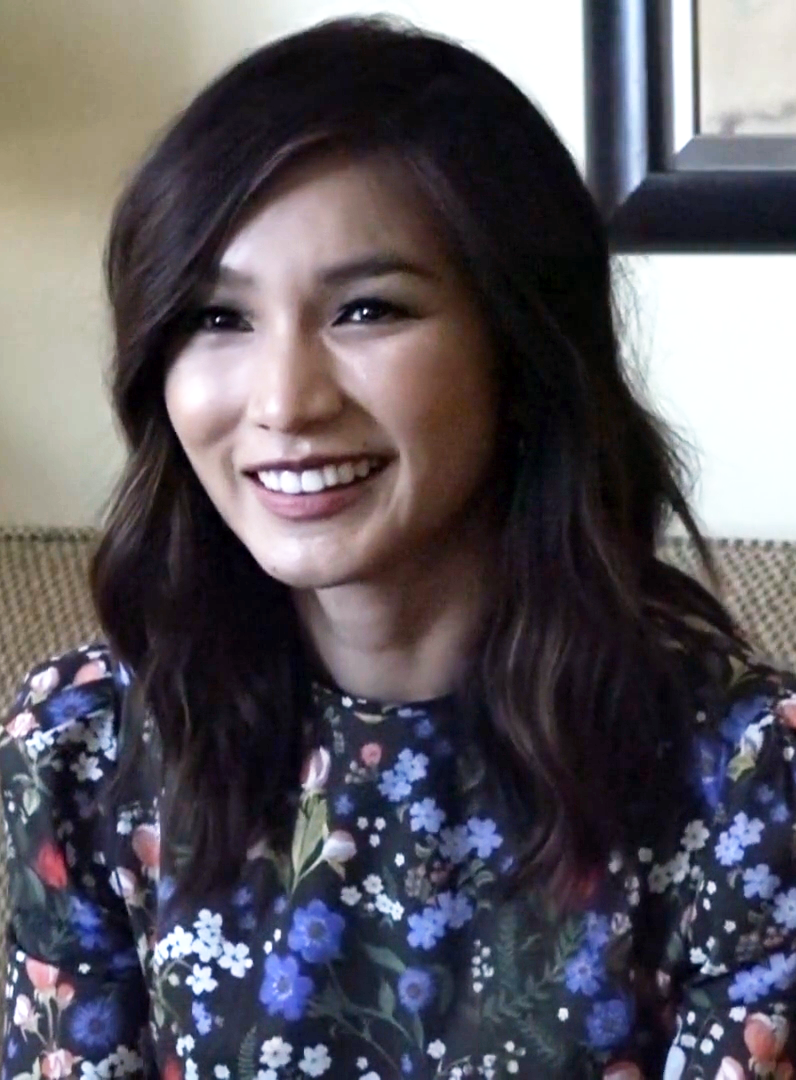
Gemma Chan

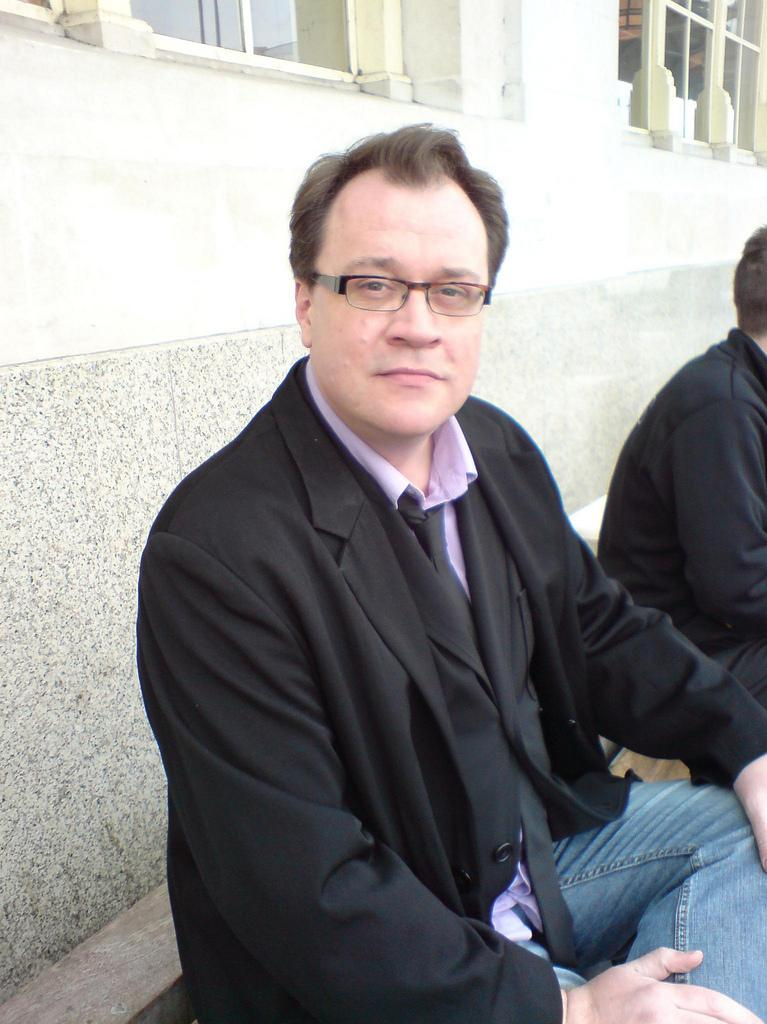
Russell T Davies

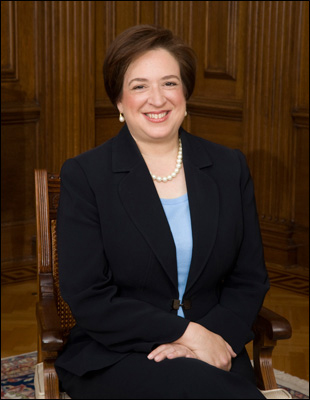
Elena Kagan

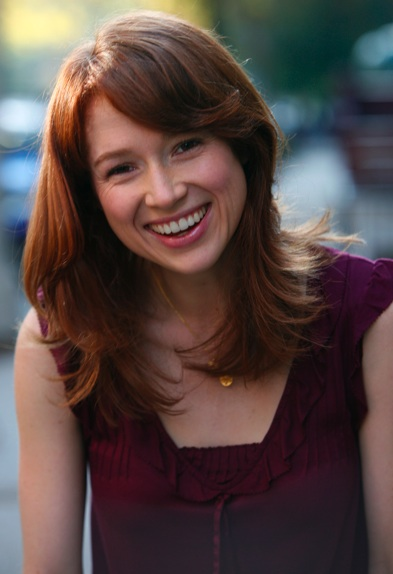
Ellie Kemper

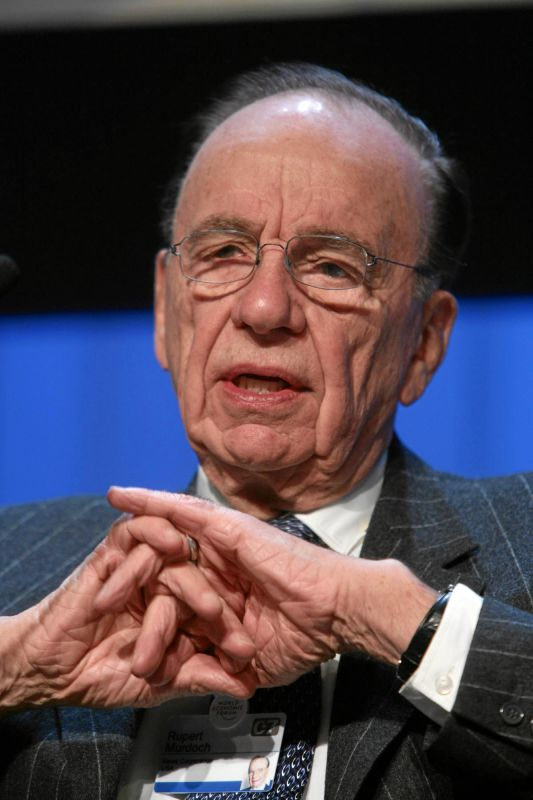
Rupert Murdoch

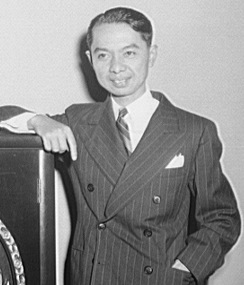
Seni Pramoj

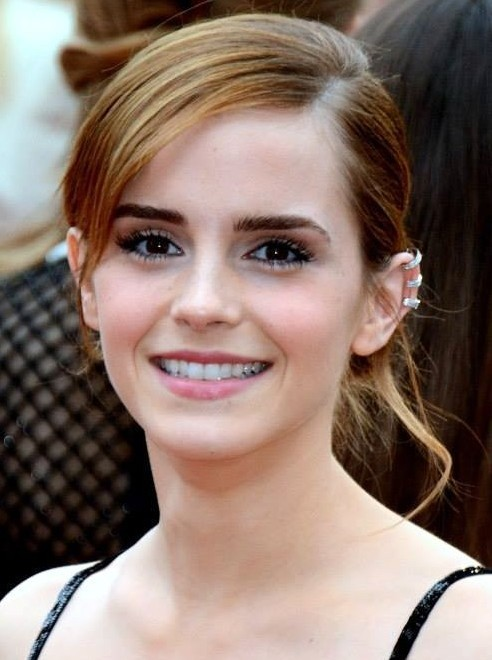
Emma Watson
- Richard Adams
- Perry Anderson
- Giles Andreae, a.k.a. Edward Monkton or Purple Ronnie
- Bill Bradley
- Brian Briggs, singer-songwriter with Stornoway and The Glass Aisle
- Simon Brown, Baron Brown of Eaton-under-Heywood
- Alastair Burnet
- Simon Burns
- Peter Clift
- Andrew Cockburn
- Alex Cox
- Gemma Chan
- Russell T Davies
- Sir Kenelm Digby (Gloucester Hall)
- Arthur Lee Dixon
- Simon Donaldson
- Jill Duff
- John de Feckenham (Gloucester College)
- Richard Flanagan
- Sir Peter Gibson, Lord Justice of Appeal
- Jason Gissing
- Sir Iain Glidewell, Lord Justice of Appeal
- Rev Archibald Edward Glover
- Robert Govett
- Andy Green
- Sir Jeremy Greenstock
- Matthew Hall Novelist, Screenwriter
- Sir Peter Hayman, Diplomat and paedophile
- Tony Hey
- Nicky Hoberman
- John Hood
- Sir Martin Jacomb
- Robin Hull, music critic
- Alice Jolly, novelist and memoirist
- Elena Kagan
- Bryan Kelly, composer
- Ellie Kemper
- Charles Kent
- David Kirk
- Peter Kosminsky
- John Lahr
- Robb LaKritz
- Toby Litt
- Serge Lourie
- Richard Lovelace (Gloucester Hall)
- Nelson McCausland
- Randal Alexander McDonnell, 10th Earl of Antrim
- Anna Markland
- John Cecil Masterman
- Glyn Maxwell
- Sir William McKie
- Sir Roy Meadow
- John Michuki
- Francis Orpen Morris
- Sir Alastair Morton
- Candida Moss
- Rupert Murdoch
- Herbert Murrill
- Sir David Nabarro
- Brooks Newmark
- Steven Norris
- Cristina Odone
- Anton Oliver
- Sir Lindsay Owen-Jones
- Constantine Phipps, 5th Marquess of Normanby
- Rachel Portman
- Dennis Price
- Nicholas Purcell
- Thomas De Quincey
- Tim Razzall, Baron Razzall
- Peter Rodman
- Michael Radford
- John Sainsbury, Baron Sainsbury of Preston Candover
- Anthony Seldon
- Abdullah of Pahang
- Nazrin Shah of Perak
- Seni Pramoj
- Philip MacDonald Sheppard
- Anne-Marie Slaughter
- Laura Solon
- Jon Speelman
- Sir Brian Stewart
- Nicholas Stewart
- Lord Sudeley
- Victoria "Plum" Sykes
- Sir Stephen Tomlinson, Lord Justice of Appeal
- Rev. Canon Thomas Benjamin Watkins, Anglican priest
- Emma Watson, visiting student
- David Wood, Actor and Playwright
- Woodrow Wyatt

Fictional alumni of the college include Nick Guest from The Line of Beauty by Alan Hollinghurst.

== See also ==
- Bromsgrove School that shares a similar coat of arms, based on those of their joint benefactor, Sir Thomas Cookes of Norgrove.

== Sources ==
- Sherwood, Jennifer; Pevsner, Nikolaus (1996). Oxfordshire. The Buildings of England. Yale University Press. ISBN 978-0-300-09639-2.
