= Sir Thomas Cookes, 2nd Baronet =

British baronet

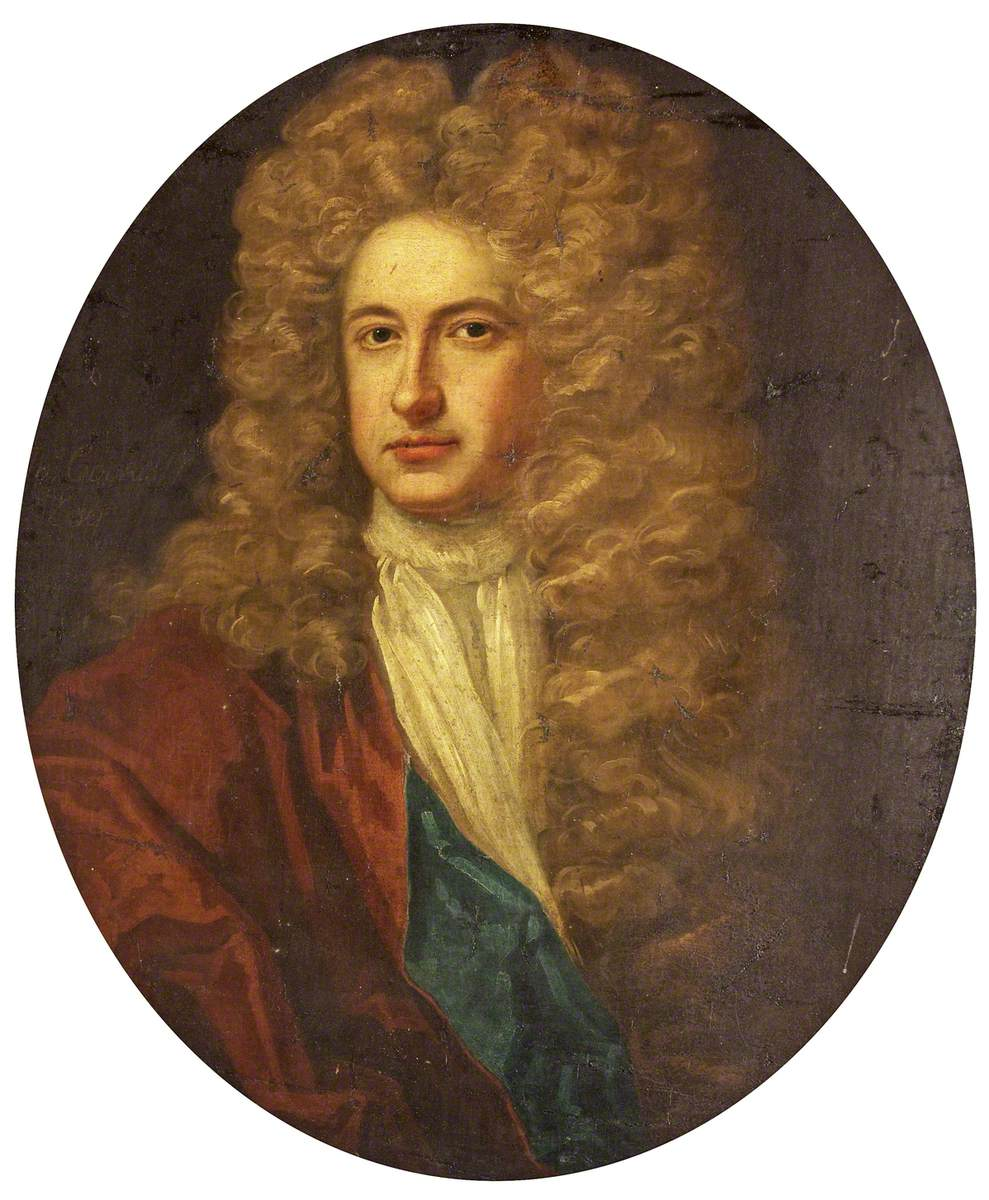
A portrait of Sir Thomas Cookes, 2nd Baronet by Peter Lely

Arms of Cookes: Argent, two chevronels between six martlets 3, 2 and 1 gules

Sir Thomas Cookes, 2nd Baronet (bap. 1648 – 8 June 1701) was an English philanthropist who was the benefactor of Worcester College, Oxford and Bromsgrove School.

== Biography ==
He was the eldest son of Sir William Cookes, 1st Baronet, of Norgrove Court, Worcestershire, and his second wife, Mercy, née Dinely. He began his studies at Pembroke College, Oxford in June 1667, going on to Lincoln's Inn in June 1669. Following the death of his father, he succeeded to the baronetcy in July 1672, His seat was Bentley Pauncefote at Tardebigge, Worcestershire.

Both of Cookes's marriages were without issue. He died on 8 June 1701 and was buried next to his first wife in Tardebigge church on 10 June.

== Legacy ==
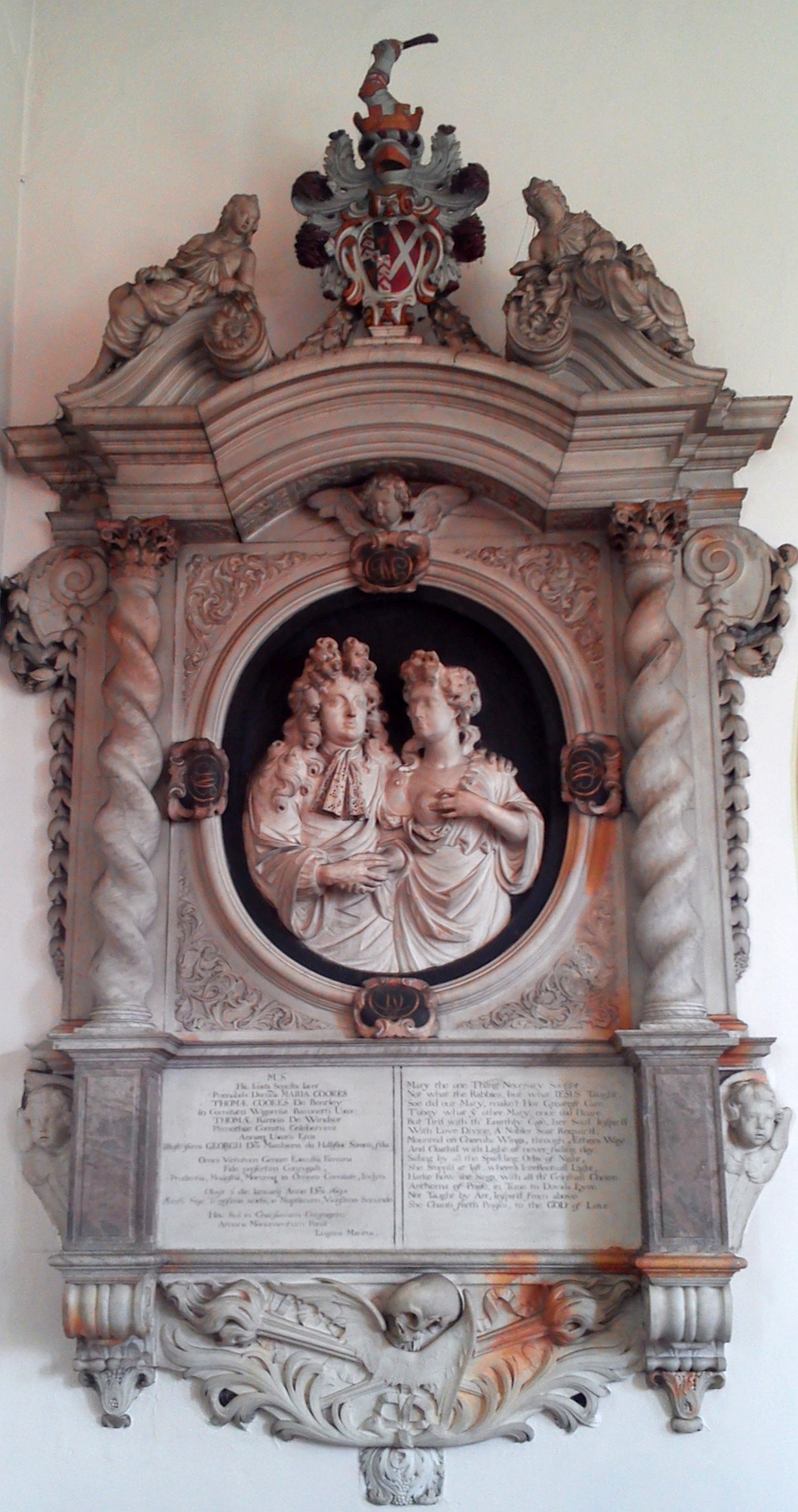
Mural monument to Sir Thomas Cookes, 2nd Baronet and his first wife Mary Windsor, St Bartholomew's Church, Tardebigge

In 1693 Cookes endowed Bromsgrove School. In his will, he then left £10,000 in trust to endow a new college at the University of Oxford, or to add to an existing foundation there. Priority for acceptance should be for students from Bromsgrove School, Feckenham, and his relatives.

Negotiations had begun in Cookes's lifetime, with Thomas Tenison prompting him in 1698. With the prospect of endowment for an Oxford college, Benjamin Woodroffe, Principal of Gloucester Hall, had earlier gained a charter of incorporation and laid down statutes for the new college; but Cookes did not like its terms. James Butler, 2nd Duke of Ormonde as Oxford's Chancellor made clear to Cookes in early 1700 that he favoured Balliol College as recipient; and Roger Mander the Vice-Chancellor moved to implement Ormonde's wish. John Baron, Balliol's Master, made representations for the endowment.

Both parties dealt directly with Cookes and preached sermons on charity in Feckenham church (Baron in 1699, Woodroffe in 1700), as well as producing printed arguments in 1702. The will was proved on 9 July 1701, but the interpretation and execution of his intentions regarding the gift to Oxford took time to settle. It was initially decided that Magdalen Hall should be the recipient, but on 31 October 1712 the Lord Keeper, Simon Harcourt, 1st Viscount Harcourt, decreed in the Court of Chancery that Cookes's wishes were that the money, now totalling £15,000, should go to Gloucester Hall. The trustees agreed to this on 16 November 1713 and Gloucester Hall was incorporated as Worcester College on 29 July 1714.

Cookes left a fee-simple estate of some £3000 per annum and, including the £10,000 earmarked for the Oxford college, a personal estate of £40,000. Norgrove Hall was left to his nephew Thomas Winford on condition that he adopted the additional surname of Cookes.

== Family ==
On 28 August 1672 Cookes married Mary Windsor, the daughter of Thomas Hickman-Windsor, 1st Earl of Plymouth, and niece of George Savile, 1st Marquess of Halifax. She died on 3 January 1695, and on 6 December 1695 he married Lucy Whalley.

Baronetage of England
Preceded by William Cookes	Baronet (of Norgrove) c. 1672–1701	Extinct
