= Cookes baronets =

Extinct baronetcy in the Baronetage of England

Arms of Cookes: Argent, two chevronels between six martlets 3, 2 and 1 gules

The Cookes Baronetcy, of Norgrove in the County of Worcester, was a title in the Baronetage of England. It was created on 24 December 1664 for William Cookes, in reward of his support for the Royalist cause during the Civil War. The second Baronet was the founder of Worcester College, Oxford. The title became extinct on his death in 1701.

== Cookes baronets, of Norgrove (1664) ==
- Sir William Cookes, 1st Baronet (c. 1618 – c. 1672)
- Sir Thomas Cookes, 2nd Baronet (c. 1649–1701)
