= Henry Bradshaw (poet) =

Henry Bradshaw (c. 1450–1513) was an English poet born in Chester. In his boyhood he was received into the Benedictine monastery of Saint Werburgh, and after studying with other novices of his order at Gloucester College, Oxford, he returned to his monastery at Chester.

== Biography ==
Bradshaw wrote a Latin treatise De antiquitate et magnificentia Urbis Cestricie, which is lost, and a life of the patron saint of his monastery in English seven-lined stanza. This work was completed in the year of its author's death, 1513, mentioned in "A balade to the auctour" printed at the close of the work. A second ballad describes him as "Harry Braddeshaa, of Chestre abbey monke." Bradshaw disclaims the merit of originality and quotes the authorities from which he translates—Bede, William of Malmesbury, Giraldus Cambrensis, Alfred of Beverley, Henry of Huntingdon, Ranulph Higden, and especially the "Passionary" or life of the saint preserved in the monastery. The poem, therefore, which is defined by its editor, Dr Carl Horstmann, as a "legendary epic," is rather a compilation than a translation. It contains a good deal of history beside the actual life of the saint. St Werburgh was the daughter of Wulfhere, king of Mercia, and Bradshaw gives a description of the kingdom of Mercia, with a full account of its royal house. He relates the history of St Ermenilde and St Sexburge, mother and grandmother of Werburgh, who were successively abbesses of Ely. He does not neglect the miraculous elements of the story, but he is more attracted by historical fact than legend, and the second book narrates the Danish invasion of 875, and describes the history and antiquities of Chester, from its foundation by the legendary giant Leon Gaur, from which he derives the British name of Caerleon, down to the great fire which devastated the city in 1180, but was suddenly extinguished when the shrine of St Werburgh was carried in procession through the streets.

The Holy Lyfe and History of saynt Werburge very frutefull for all Christen people to rede (printed by Richard Pynson, 1521) has been very variously estimated. Thomas Warton, who deals with Bradshaw at some length, quotes as the most splendid passage of the poem the description of the feast preceding Werburgh's entry into the religious life. He considered Bradshaw's versification "infinitely inferior to Lydgate's worst manner." Dr Horstmann, on the other hand, finds in the poem "original genius, of a truly epic tone, with a native simplicity of feeling which sometimes reminds the reader of Homer." Most readers will probably adopt a view between these extremes. Bradshaw expresses the humblest opinion of his own abilities, and he certainly had no delicate ear for rhythm. His sincerity is abundantly evident, and his piety is admitted even by John Bale, hostile as he was to monkish writers. W. Herbert thought that a Lyfe of Saynt Radegunde, also printed by Pynson, was certainly by Bradshaw. The only extant copy is in the Britwell library.

Pynson's edition of the Holy Lyfe is very rare, only five copies being known. A reprint copying the original type was edited by Mr. Edward Hawkins for the Chetham Society in 1848, and by Dr Carl Hortsmann for the Early English Text Society in 1887.
