= Alexander Helladius =

Greek scholar

Alexander Helladius (Greek: Ἁλέξανδρος Ἐλλάδιος, 1686-?) was an 18th-century Greek scholar and humanist from Larissa, who studied at the Greek College of Oxford University and published several works on the Greek language and tradition.

== Life and work ==
He was a student of the Corfiote hierodeacon Frangiskos Prosalentis. He arrived in England in 1703 as the escort of Lord William Paget, ambassador to the Ottoman Empire. He saw himself as a genuine heir of an unbroken classical tradition and tried to combat Western misconceptions of Hellenism, while his excellent knowledge of the Greek language secured him valuable contacts, especially at the University of Altdorf. In 1712 he published in Nuremberg an older Greek grammar by Bessarion Makris to which he appended a fictitious dialogue countering the arguments in favour of the Erasmian pronunciation of ancient Greek. Later, in Status Praesens, he counters the arguments of some Western scholars that the contemporary Greeks spoke a barbarian language (barbarograeca) and could not understand ancient Greek. Helladius sought to show the unbroken continuity of the culture of the Greek people and was adamant in his opposition to the translation of the New Testament into the vernacular.

== Known works ==
- Status Praesens Ecclesiae Graecae: In Quo Etiam Causae Exponuntur Cur Graeci Moderni Novi Testamenti (1714)

== See also ==
- Greek scholars in the Renaissance
