= Nicholas Stewart =

English lawyer

Nicholas Stewart KC
- Born: Nicholas John Cameron Stewart; 16 April 1947
- Education: Bedford Modern School
- Alma mater: Worcester College, Oxford
- Occupation: Barrister
- Known for: Narrator of the BBC Radio Series No Further Questions?

Nicholas John Cameron Stewart KC (born 16 April 1947), is a British Barrister, King's Counsel, Bencher of the Inner Temple (since 1999), Deputy High Court Judge (Chancery Division and King's Bench Division since 1991), former chairman of the Bar Human Rights Commission (1994–98), former president of the Union Internationale des Avocats (2001–02), former narrator of the BBC Radio Series No Further Questions? and current chairman of the Democratic Progress Institute.

== Early life ==
Stewart was born on 16 April 1947, the son of John Cameron Stewart and Margaret Mary (née Botsford). He was educated at Bedford Modern School and gained an exhibition to read Philosophy, Politics and Economics at Worcester College, Oxford.

== Career ==
Stewart was called to the bar at the Inner Temple in 1971, taking silk in 1987 and being made a Bencher of the Inner Temple in 1999. Since 1991 he has been a Deputy High Court Judge (Chancery Division and King's Bench Division). Stewart is a former chairman of the Bar Human Rights Commission (1994–98) and a former president of the Union Internationale des Avocats (2001–02). He was lead counsel to Momčilo Krajišnik, former president of Republika Srpska, who was tried for crimes against humanity at the International Criminal Tribunal for the former Yugoslavia.

Outside of the law, Stewart was a narrator of the BBC Radio Series No Further Questions? and is Chairman of the Democratic Progress Institute.

== Personal life ==
Stewart married Pamela Jean Windham in 1974. Pamela is a forensic psychotherapist of Texan descent. Her sister is the writer and entrepreneur Margaret Heffernan. Nicholas and Pamela have one son, Senan, and two daughters, Rosalind and Olivia. The marriage was dissolved in 2000. Stewart also has a daughter by his partner Dr Tabea Lauktien.
