= Benjamin Woodroffe =

English cleric and college head

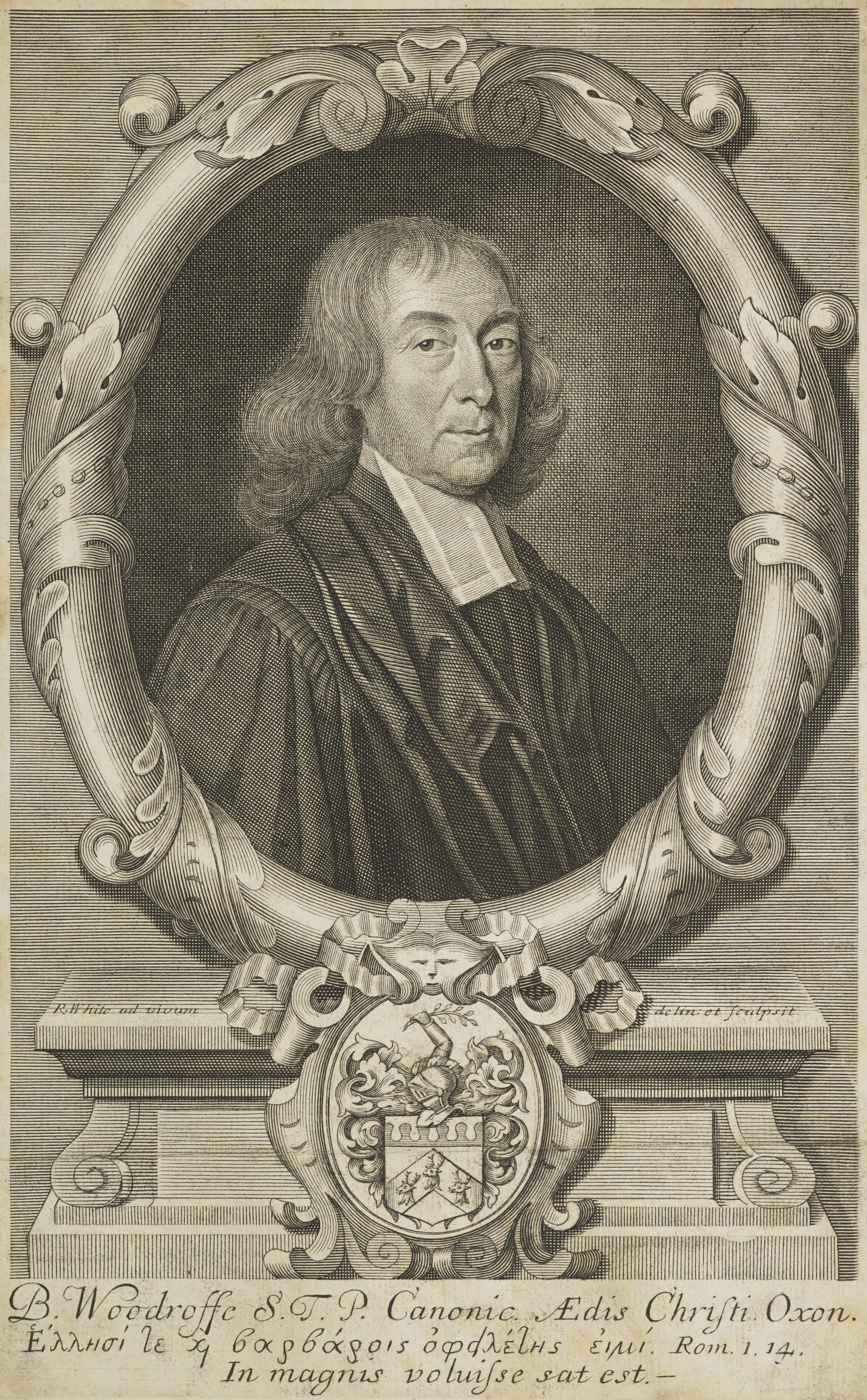
Benjamin Woodroffe

Benjamin Woodroffe (1638–1711) was an English cleric and college head.

== Life ==
The son of the Rev. Timothy Woodroffe, he was born in Canditch Street, St. Mary Magdalen parish, Oxford, in April 1638. He was educated at Westminster School, and was elected to Christ Church, Oxford, in 1656, matriculating on 23 July 1656. He graduated B.A. 1 November 1659, M.A. 17 June 1662, and he was incorporated at Cambridge in 1664. From about 1662 he was a noted tutor at Christ Church, and in 1663 he studied chemistry with Anthony Wood, John Locke, and others, at Oxford under Peter Staehl. He was admitted Fellow of the Royal Society on 7 May 1668.

Woodroffe was appointed chaplain to James, Duke of York in 1669, and served with him when the duke was in command of HMS Royal Prince in the battle of Sole Bay on 28 May 1672. It led to his appointment as chaplain to Charles II in 1674, and to advancement in the church. He became lecturer to the Temple Church in November 1672, and through the influence of the Duke of York was installed canon of Christ Church on 17 December 1672. On 14 January 1673 he proceeded B.D. and D.D.

Through the favour of Theophilus Hastings, 7th Earl of Huntingdon, a former pupil, Woodroffe was instituted in 1673 to the vicarage of Piddlehinton in Dorset; but resigned it in the next year, when he was made subdean of Christ Church. At this time Woodroffe was a frequent preacher at Oxford, though according to Humphrey Prideaux the subject of ridicule. In 1675 he was appointed to the vicarage of Shrivenham, Berkshire, on the nomination of Heneage Finch, to whose three sons he had been tutor at Christ Church; Prideaux asserted that he got the living by tricking Richard Peers. He was appointed to the rectory of St Bartholomew-by-the-Exchange, London, on 19 April 1676, and he was collated to a canonry in Lichfield Cathedral on 21 September 1678. These preferments he held with his canonry at Christ Church for the rest of his life.

In 1685 Woodroffe was a likely candidate for the bishopric of Oxford, but did not obtain the appointment. He was nominated Dean of Christ Church by James II on 8 December 1688. He was not installed, the Glorious Revolution intervening, and the deanery went to Henry Aldrich. Woodroffe was admitted on 15 August 1692 as principal of Gloucester Hall. It was run down, and by connections among the gentry Woodroffe drew in several students. He began rebuilding it, in the hope of attracting to it young Greek student brought to England by the advocates of union of the Church of England and the Greek Orthodox Church. About 1697 he started, on an adjoining site, the Greek College, Oxford. Flimsy in construction, no one would live in it, and it was known as "Woodroffe's folly" until it was demolished in 1806. By February 1699 five young Greeks had been brought from Smyrna, and the number rose to ten. The management of the college and other issues brought a negative reaction from the Greek ecclesiastical authorities at Constantinople, and study at Oxford was forbidden. One of the students, Franciscos Prossalentes, printed in 1706 a work in Greek, reprinted in 1862, that was damaging to Woodroffe's reputation. Some of the Greek students became Catholics. Woodroffe received a royal grant for the project.

Sir Thomas Cookes, 2nd Baronet, a Worcestershire baronet, decided in July 1697 to spend £10,000 as an endowment for a college at Oxford. Gloucester Hall was favoured; but the money was put in question by Woodroffe inserting in the charter a clause that the king might hire and fire fellows as he wished. It was withdrawn, but Cookes still refused to carry out his intention. Woodroffe preached a sharp sermon on 23 May 1700 at Feckenham before the trustees of the Cookes charity. The baronet died in 1701, and the bill for settling his charity on Gloucester Hall was defeated in the House of Commons after passing through the House of Lords on 29 April 1702. Three pamphlets were issued by Woodroffe in its support, and an anonymous reply was written by John Baron. The matter was not settled until after Woodroffe's death.

Through his second wife, Woodroffe was "proprietor of one of the salt-rocks in Cheshire", and he bought the manor of Marbury in 1705 for £19,000. When he could not complete the purchase, two actions concerning these estates were taken to the House of Lords, and he lost them both. He was for some time confined in the Fleet Prison, and his canonry was sequestrated in April 1709.

Woodroffe died in London on 14 August 1711, and was buried on 19 August in his own vault in his church of St Bartholomew-by-the-Exchange. The church was demolished in 1840.

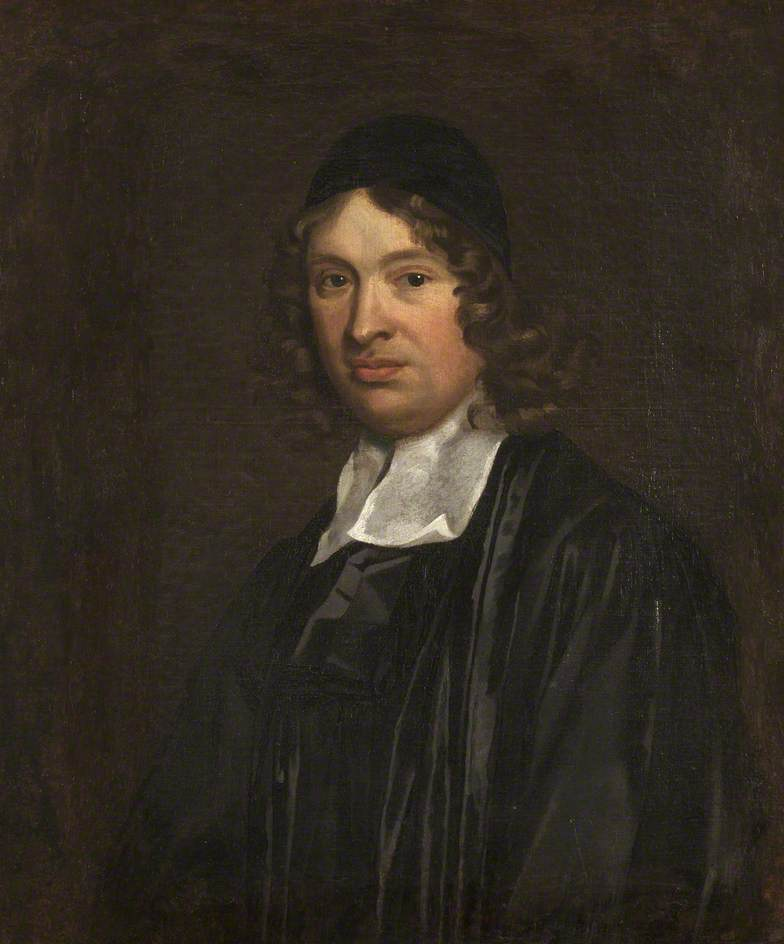
Portrait thought to be of Benjamin Woodroffe

== Works ==
Woodroffe wrote:

- Somnium Navale, 1673, a Latin poem on the battle of Sole Bay.
- The Great Question how far Religion is concerned in Policy and Civil Government, 1679.
- The Fall of Babylon: Reflections on the Novelties of Rome by B. W., D.D., 1690. Woodroffe claimed the licensor would not allow its publication in March 1687; Vallance considers it likely he forged related correspondence to substantiate his assertions.
- O Livro da Oração Commun (English prayer-book and Psalms translated into Portuguese by Woodroffe and R. Abendana, Judæus), 1695.
- Examinis et examinantis examen, adversus calumnias F. Foris Otrokocsi, 1700.
- Daniel's Seventy Weeks explained, 1702.
- De S. Scripturarum Aὐταρκείᾳ, dialogi duo inter Geo. Aptal et Geo. Marules præside Benj. Woodroffe Græce, 1704.

He also published individual sermons and poems in Oxford collections.

== Family ==
On 15 November 1676 Woodroffe obtained a licence to marry Dorothy Stonehouse of Besselsleigh, Berkshire, a sister of Sir Blewett Stonehouse, with a reputed fortune of £3,000. They went to live at Knightsbridge, so as to be near the court.

Woodroffe married, as his second wife, Mary Marbury, sister and one of the three coheiresses of William and Richard Marbury.

== Notes ==
Attribution

This article incorporates text from a publication now in the public domain: Lee, Sidney, ed. (1900). "Woodroffe, Benjamin". Dictionary of National Biography. Vol. 62. London: Smith, Elder & Co.
