= Gloucester College, Oxford =

Former college of the University of Oxford

Gloucester College
- University of Oxford
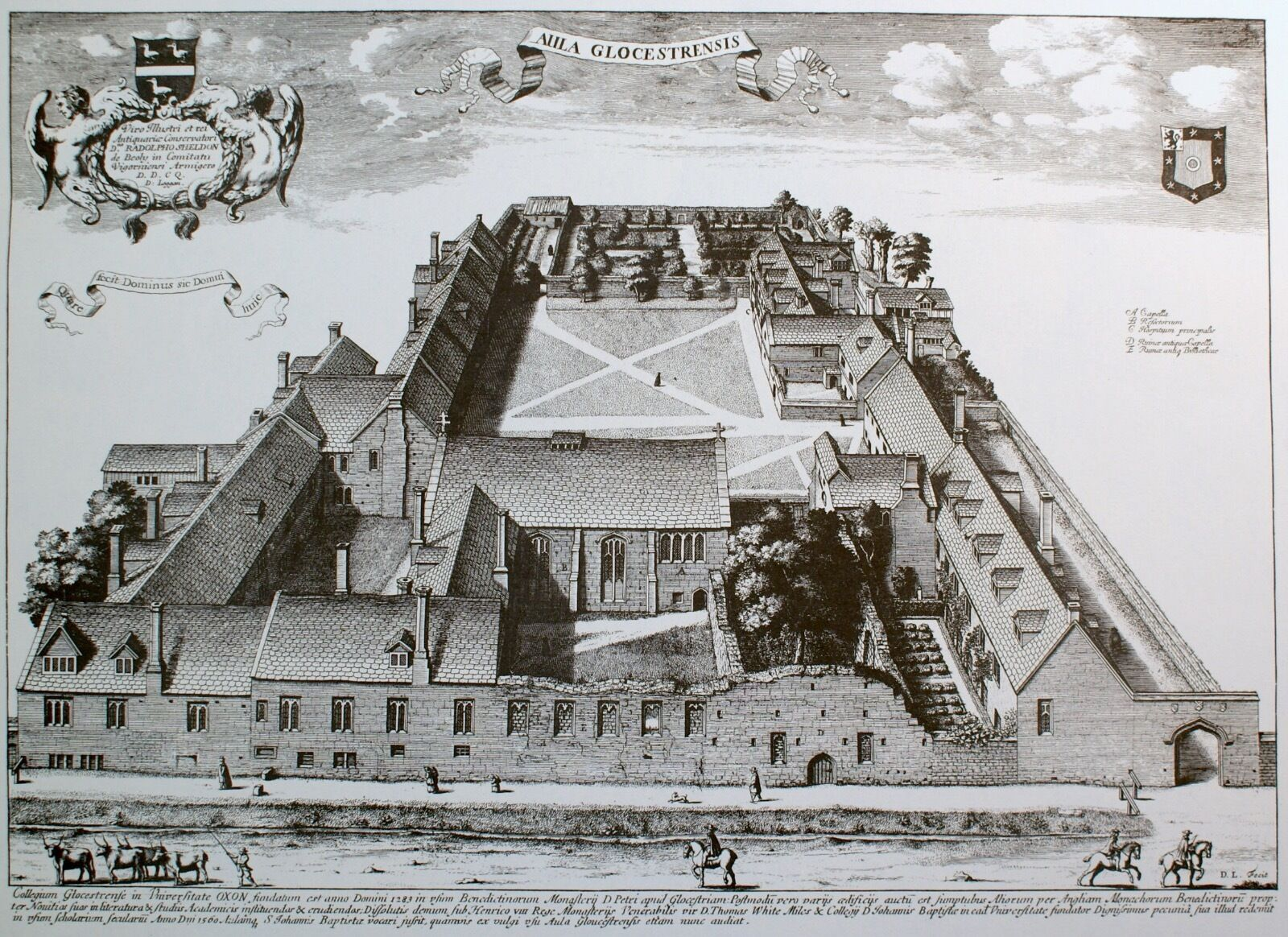
- Gloucester Hall in 1675
- Location: Present day Worcester Street
- Coordinates: 51.75497°N 1.26370°W
- Established: 1283; 743 years ago
- Closed: 1542; 484 years ago (annexed to St John's); 1714; 312 years ago (refounded as Worcester College)
- Named for: St Peter's Abbey, Gloucester
- Former names: Gloucester College (1283-1542); Gloucester Hall (1542-1714)

Map
- Location within Oxford city centre

Gloucester College, Oxford, was a Benedictine institution of the University of Oxford in Oxford, England, from the late 13th century until the dissolution of the monasteries in the 16th century. It was never a typical college of the University; in that there was an internal division in the college, by staircase units, into parts where the monasteries sending monks had effective authority. The overall head was a Prior, later changed to a Prior Studentium, and finally a Principal.

It later became Gloucester Hall, an academic hall and annexe of St John's College and was again refounded in 1714 as Worcester College by Sir Thomas Cookes.

== History ==
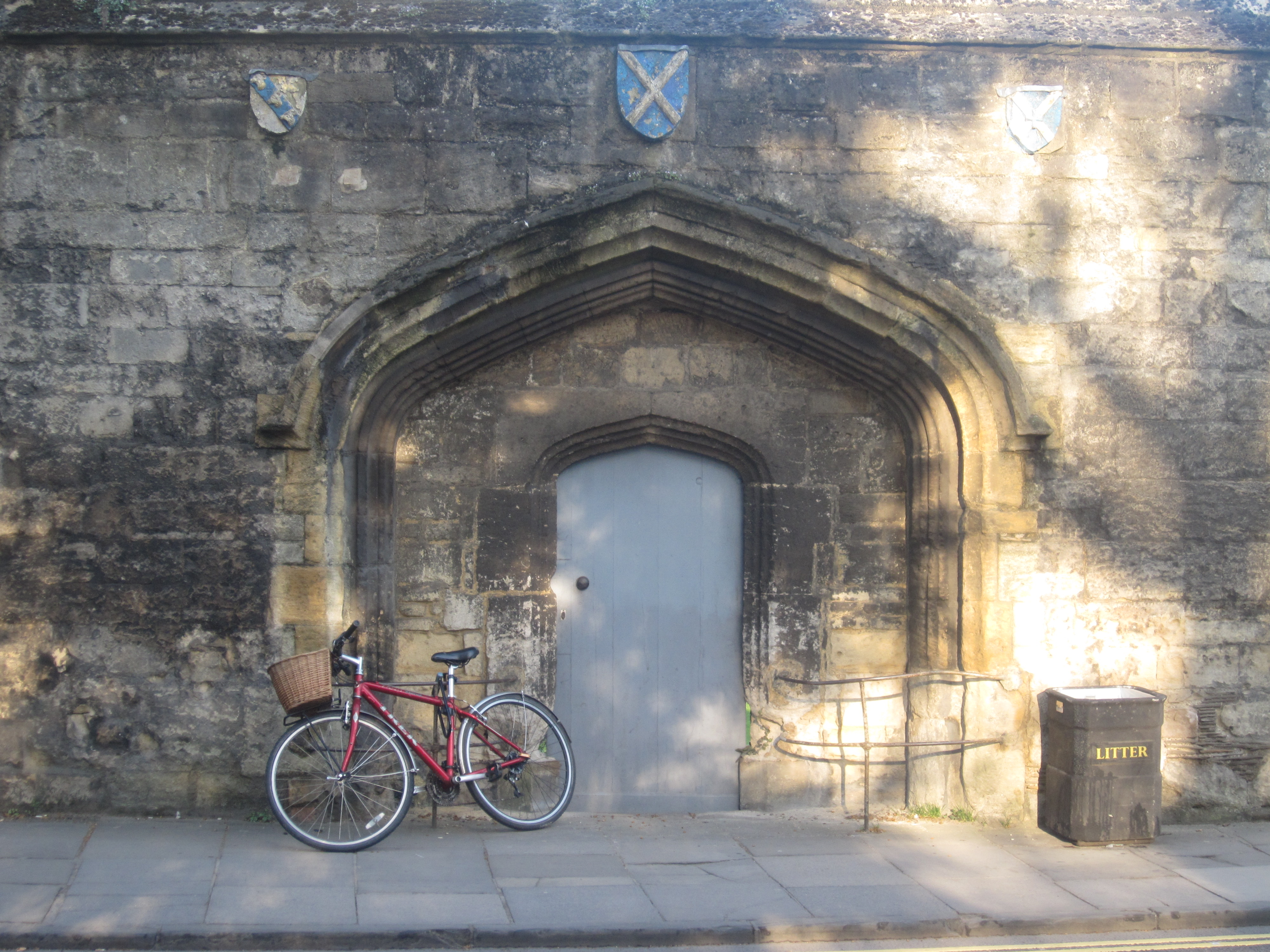
15th-century gateway of Gloucester College bearing the arms of the abbeys of Winchcombe, St Albans and Ramsey

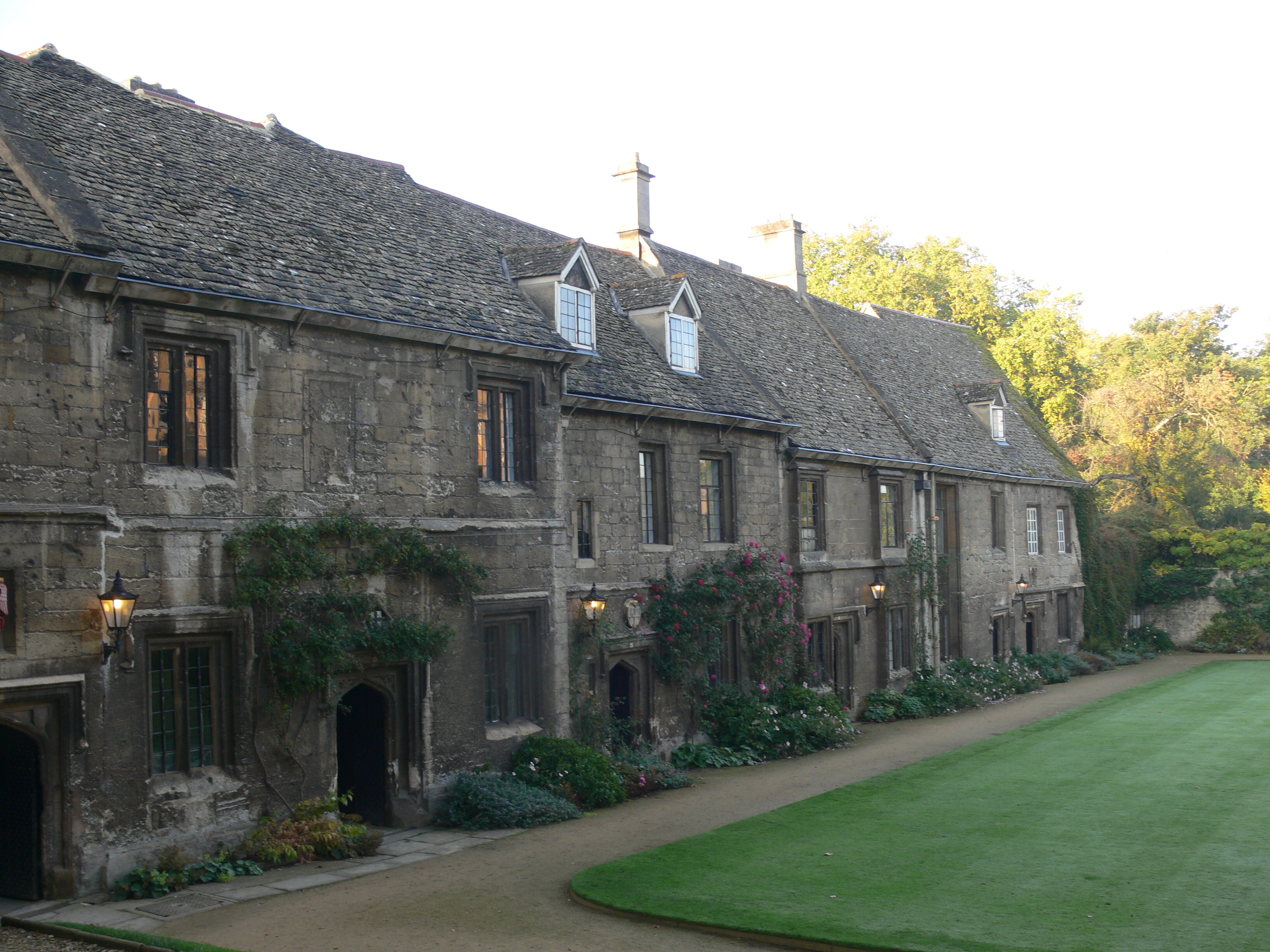
Surviving 15th-century buildings of Gloucester College, with the arms of various abbeys above the doors

In 1283, John Giffard gave a house in Stockwell Street, Oxford, to the Benedictine order of the Province of Canterbury, which the province allocated to St. Peter's Abbey, Gloucester to operate as a cell for thirteen student monks. There was early friction with the local Carmelites, who had also claimed the land, and brought an assize of novel disseisin in 1288.

In 1291 Giffard granted further property, and general chapters of 1290 and 1291 decided to expand the establishment into an independent priory, to take student monks from all the priories of the province, with Gloucester renouncing its claim over the property. Henry de Heliun was appointed the first prior.

Pope Benedict XII in 1337 laid down, in the bull Pastor bonus, that 5% of Benedictine monks should be university students. The bull also led to the title of Prior being changed to Prior Studentium, elected by the students themselves. But from the middle of the 14th century onwards there was an alternative, at the University of Cambridge. There were also the Benedictine Durham College, Oxford, and Canterbury College, Oxford. Even though the catchment area after 1337 included the Province of York, numbers of students were never high, one reason being the cost of living in Oxford (which the home monastery had to meet). After the Black Death, Gloucester College was closed for a time. In 1537 it was found to have 32 students.

At the Dissolution the property passed to the English Crown, then to the Bishop of Oxford in 1542, who sold it to Sir Thomas White. White was the founder of St John's College, Oxford, and Gloucester Hall, as it then became, was treated as an Annexe to St John's College.

The penultimate Principal of Gloucester Hall, Benjamin Woodroffe, established a "Greek College" for Greek Orthodox students to come to Oxford, part of a scheme to make ecumenical links with the Church of England. This was active from 1699 to 1705, although only 15 Greeks are recorded as members.

The status of Gloucester Hall changed in the 18th century, when it was refounded in 1714 by Sir Thomas Cookes as Worcester College, Oxford. Oxford's Gloucester Green, which was opposite the old College, and the Gloucester House building within the current college preserve the name.

== Head of House ==
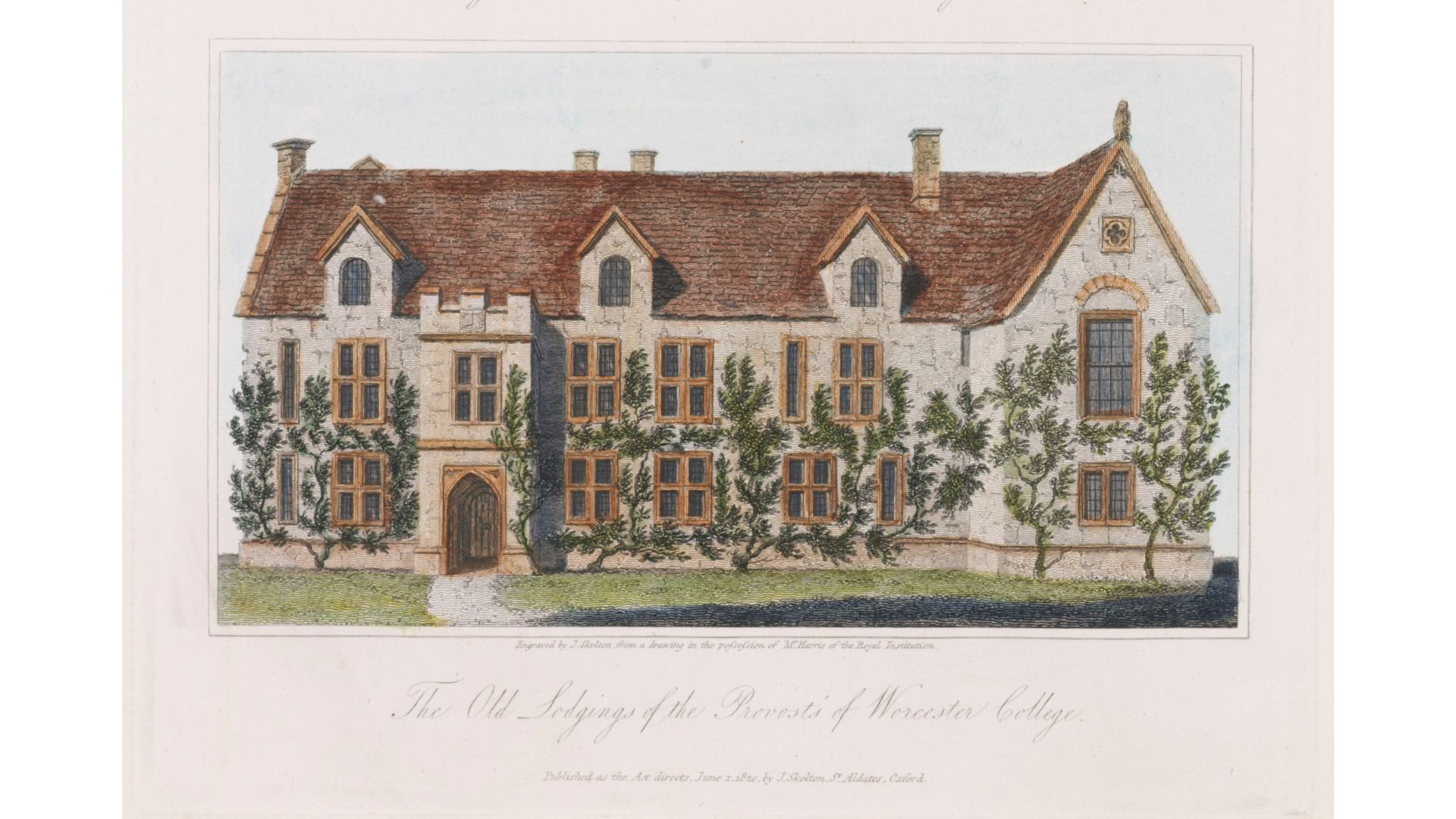
The lodgings of the Head of House

Prior

- fl. 1283–1292 Henry de Heliun/Helm
- 1302 William de Camme
- 1356 Walter de Cham

Prior Studentium

- 1366 Adam Easton
- 1376 –1377 Everard
- 1381 John Welles
- 1389 Simon Suthereye
- 1393 William Barwe
- 1401–1407 John Fordham (resigned c. 1410)
- c. 1414–1417John Wethamstede
- c. 1417–1423 Thomas Ledbury
- c. 1425–1426 Edmund Kirton
- fl. 1429–1431 John Bevere
- c. 1439–1442 Thomas Knyght (alleged)
- 1446 William Wroughton
- 1451 Magister Tully
- 1452 Richard Ryngstede
- 1492 John Kyllyngworth
- 1502 Dr. Stanywell
- c. 1512 John Wynchecombe
- 1522 Thomas Barton
- 1522–1528 John Newbolde
- fl. 1526–1529 Anthony Dunston/Kitchin
- c. 1530 Humphrey Webley
- 1534–1535 Andrew Alton
- 1537 Robert Joseph
- 1538 Thomas Wellys

Principal

- 1560–1561 William Stocke
- 1561–1563 Richard Eden
- 1563–1564 Thomas Palmer
- 1564–1576 William Stocke
- 1576–1580 Henry Russell
- 1580–1581 Christopher Bagshawe
- 1581–1593 John De la Bere
- 1587-1588 Philip Randall
- 1593–1626 John Hawley
- 1626–1647 Degory Wheare
- 1647–1647 John Maplett
- 1647–1660 Tobias Garbrand
- 1660–1662 John Maplett
- 1662–1692 Byrom Eaton
- 1692–1711 Benjamin Woodroffe
- 1711–1714 Richard Blechynden

== Alumni ==
Those who studied at the college and hall include:

=== Gloucester College (1283–1542) ===
- Henry Bradshaw
- Adam Easton
- John Feckenham
- John Lydgate (supposed)
- Richard of Wallingford

=== Gloucester Hall (1542–1714) ===
- Robert Catesby
- Kenelm Digby
- Richard Lovelace
- Thomas Coryate
- Edward Kelley
