= Greek College, Oxford =

Short-lived 17th-century college at Oxford University

Greek College
- University of Oxford
- Coordinates: 51.754698°N 1.263932°W
- Established: 1699
- Closed: 1705
- Named for: Nationality of students (Greek)

Map
- Location within Oxford city centre

The Greek College, established 1699, was a short-lived attempt to create a separate college for Greek Orthodox students at Oxford University in Oxford, England. This was active from 1699 to 1705, although only 15 Greeks are recorded as members.

During the 17th century, there was regular contact and exchange of theological views between Eastern Orthodoxy and the various Protestant churches (cf. Patriarch Cyril of Constantinople), with some aiming for a union against their common dogmatic enemy, the Roman Catholic Church. The idea to establish a Greek Orthodox College at Oxford was first suggested in 1677, but it was only formally proposed in 1698 through the initiative of Benjamin Woodroffe, penultimate Principal of Gloucester Hall, and with the support of Lord William Paget, then ambassador to the Ottoman Empire, the Levant Company and the Greek Orthodox Church.

Woodroffe erected a building next to Beaumont Palace for the purpose of housing students, opposite Gloucester Hall, which was later known as "Woodroffe's Folly". It was taken down at the beginning of the 19th century.

The project eventually failed in 1705 due to the objections of the Greek Orthodox Church. There are only 15 Greeks reported as members, although Greeks attended Oxford both before and after the existence of the College.

One alumnus of the Greek College was Alexander Helladius.

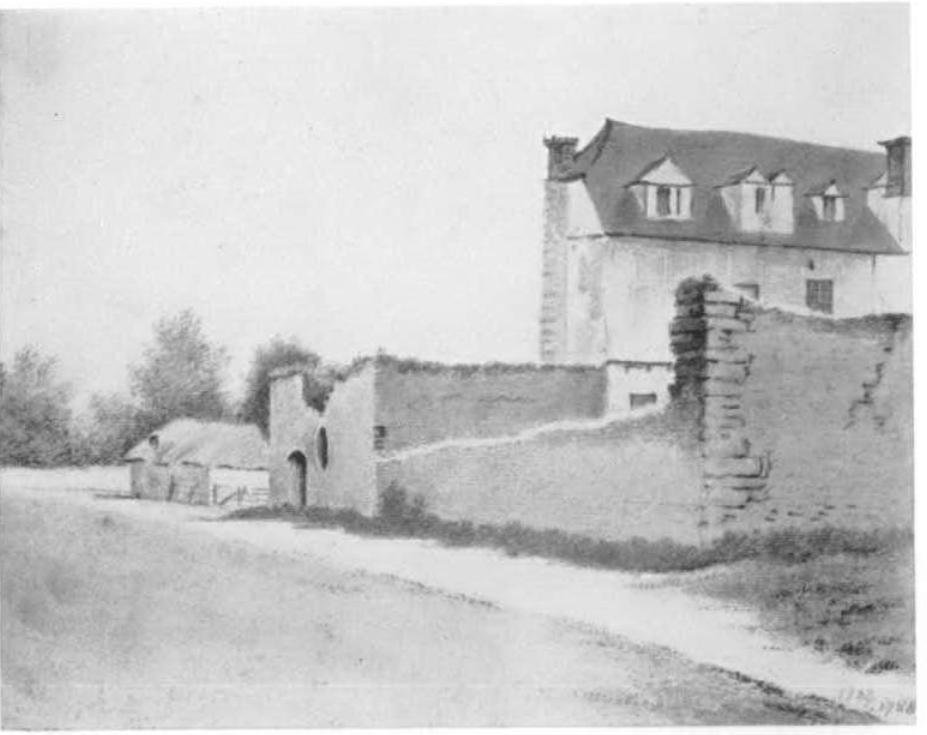
View of the ruins of Beaumont Palace with "Woodroffe's Folly" next to it from the east

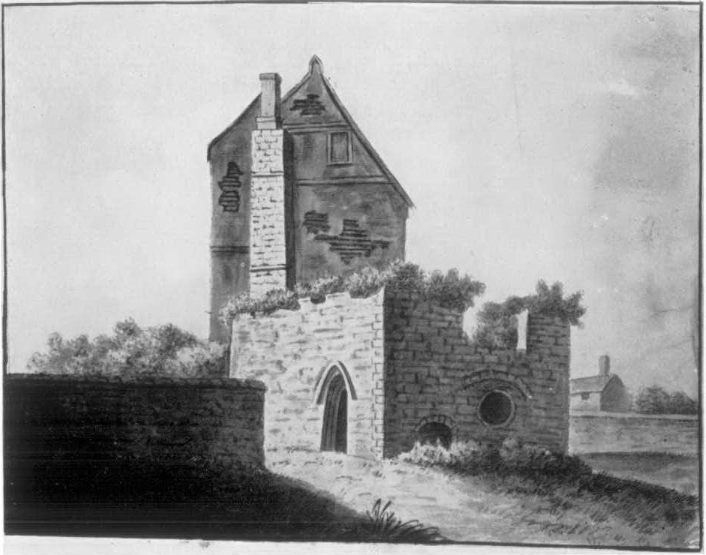
View of the ruins of Beaumont Palace with "Woodroffe's Folly" next to it from the north-east

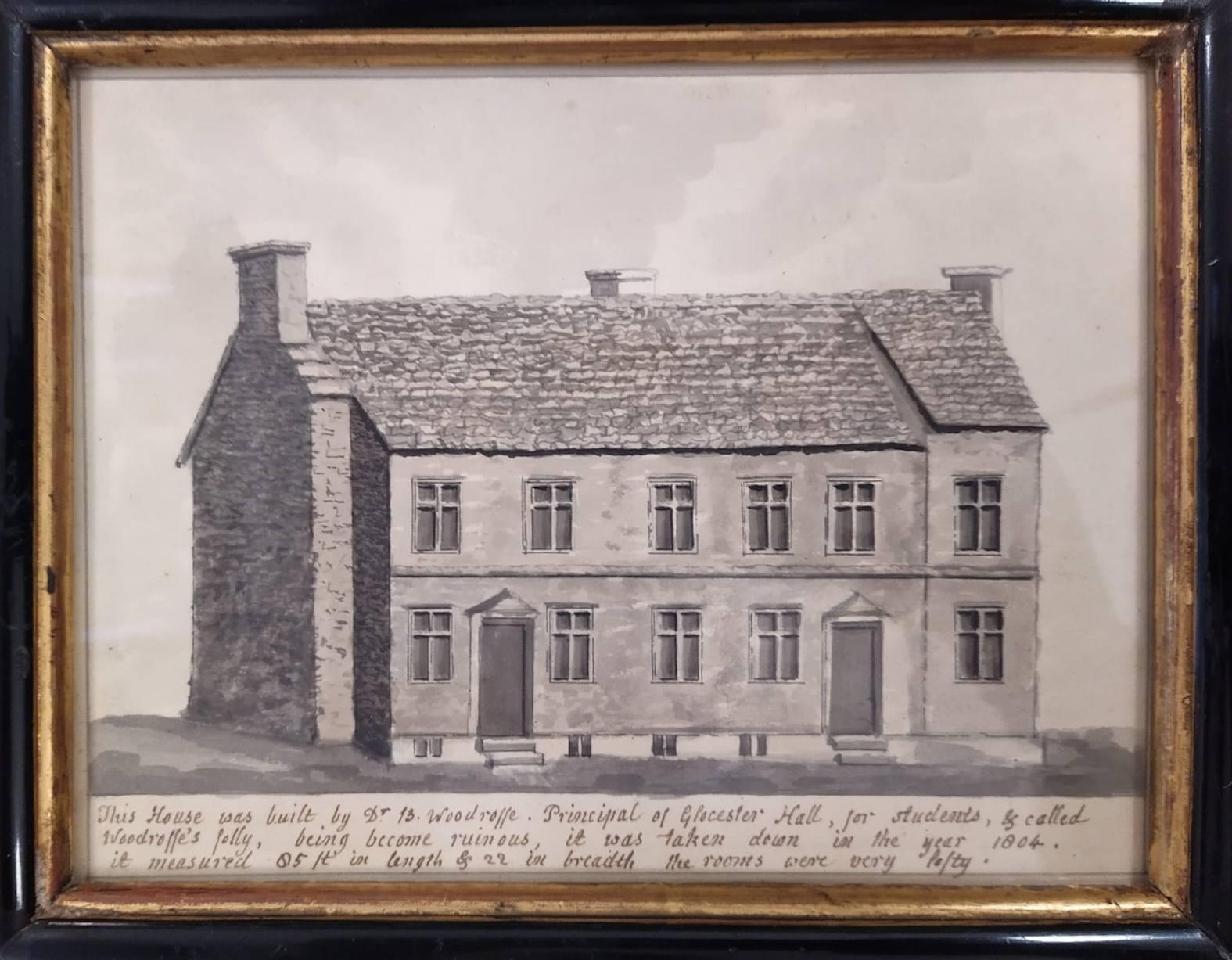
"Woodroffe's Folly"

== See also ==
- Greek scholars in the Renaissance
