= Roger Mander =

English academic administrator

Roger Mander D.D. (died 21 December 1704) was an English academic administrator at the University of Oxford.

Mander was elected Master (head) of Balliol College, Oxford on 23 October 1687, a post he held until his death in 1704. During his time as Master of Balliol, he was also Vice-Chancellor of Oxford University from 1700 until 1702.

Academic offices
Preceded by John Venn	Master of Balliol College, Oxford; 1687–1704	Succeeded by John Baron
Preceded by William Paynter	Vice-Chancellor of Oxford University; 1700–1702	Succeeded by William Delaune
