= Norgrove =

Norgrove is a surname. Notable people with the surname include:

- David Norgrove, British businessman
- Linda Norgrove, British aid worker killed in Afghanistan, see Death of Linda Norgrove
- Michael Norgrove, Zambian-born British boxer
- Norgrove Family, Irish republican family involved in the Easter Rising

== See also ==
- Norgrove Court, a stately home
