= John Baron (academic) =

English academic administrator

John Baron D.D. (died 20 January 1722) was an English academic administrator at the University of Oxford.

Baron was elected Master (head) of Balliol College, Oxford on 20 January 1705, a post he held until his death in 1722. During his time as Master of Balliol, he was also Vice-Chancellor of Oxford University from 1715 until 1718.

Academic offices
Preceded by Roger Mander	Master of Balliol College, Oxford; 1705–1726	Succeeded by Joseph Hunt
Preceded by Bernard Gardiner	Vice-Chancellor of Oxford University; 1715–1718	Succeeded by Robert Shippen
