= Webheath =

District of Redditch, England

Coordinates: 52.299242°N 1.972733°W

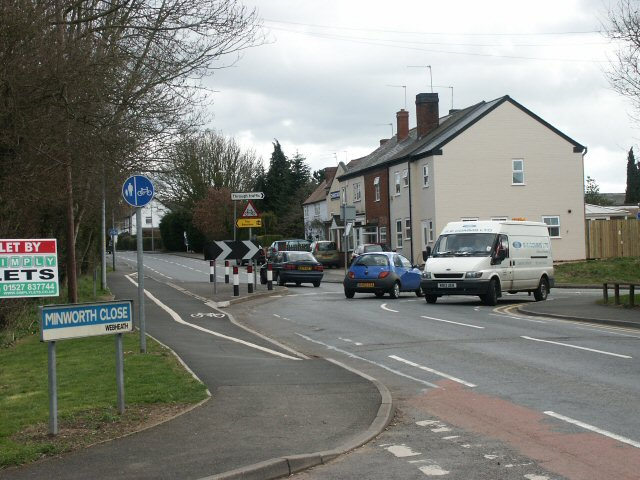
- Birchfield Road

- Location within Worcestershire
- District: Redditch
- Shire county: Worcestershire
- Region: West Midlands
- Country: England
- Sovereign state: United Kingdom
- Post town: REDDITCH
- Postcode district: B97
- Dialling code: 01527
- Police: West Mercia
- Fire: Hereford and Worcester
- Ambulance: West Midlands
- UK Parliament: Redditch

Webheath is a semi-rural district and suburb of Redditch, in Worcestershire, England. The district neighbours Batchley, Headless Cross and the village of Callow Hill. It is also near Feckenham and Astwood Bank.

There are a small selection of amenities in Webheath, such as The Rose and Crown pub, a Post Office, and the independent grocery Biddles. Webheath is served by the 11 bus service between Redditch Bus Station and Washford Mill.

== Schools ==
Webheath has two first schools, both are located on Downsell Road. They are Webheath Academy Primary School and Our Lady of Mount Carmel Catholic First School.

== Politics ==
Webheath comes under the Webheath & Callow Hill ward on Redditch Borough Council and it is represented by three councillors - Claire Davies from the Green Party, Matthew Dormer and Gemma Monaco (both from the Conservative Party).

Webheath is located in the constituency of Redditch, which was created in 1997 and represented by Labour's Jacqui Smith until her defeat in 2010. Karen Lumley of the Conservative Party represented Redditch in Westminster until her retirement in 2017, she was succeeded by fellow Conservative Rachel Maclean. She was defeated in 2024 by Chris Bloore of the Labour Party).

Webheath was formerly a township in the parish of Tardebigg, in 1866 Webheath became a separate civil parish, on 1 April 1933 the parish was abolished and merged with Redditch, Bentley Pauncefoot and "Tutnall and Cobley". In 1931 the parish had a population of 828. It is now in the unparished area of Redditch.

== St Philip's Church ==
The local Church of England Church is St Philip's on Church Road which was established by Harriett, 13th Baroness Windsor, although it was not consecrated until after her death, The church was established to serve estate workers from Hewell Grange, and as such is a comparatively modest affair (nave capacity 100) that has only recently listed as a grade II heritage building. The nave has been recently modernised and is warm and comfortable. Building work commenced in 2016 to create space for meetings and storage, and also to provide the much needed toilets.

The annual church fete at the beginning of July is a major community event, and Christmas services fill the church to capacity. There is no church history of Webheath; for most of its life it has been dealt with as a daughter church of the much grander St Bartholomew's Church in Tardebigge, although it is now part of the Redditch Holy Trinity team.
