= Elcocks Brook =

Hamlet in Worcestershire, England

Coordinates: 52.279°N 1.986°W

Elcock's Brook
- Location within Worcestershire
- Civil parish: Feckenham
- District: Redditch
- Shire county: Worcestershire
- Region: West Midlands
- Country: England
- Sovereign state: United Kingdom
- Post town: REDDITCH
- Postcode district: B97
- Dialling code: 01527
- Police: West Mercia
- Fire: Hereford and Worcester
- Ambulance: West Midlands
- UK Parliament: Redditch

Elcocks Brook (formally Elcock's Brook) is a hamlet in Feckenham parish, southwest of the town of Redditch, in Worcestershire, England.

== Politics ==
Elcock's Brook is part of the Astwood Bank and Feckenham ward on the Redditch Borough Council. It is represented by three Conservative Party councillors: Brandon Clayton, Chris Holz and Craig Warhurst.

It is part of the UK Parliament constituency of Redditch, which is represented by Chris Bloore of the Labour Party.

== Surrounding settlements ==
Elcock's Brook is to the west of the small village of Callow Hill. It lies northeast of Cruise Hill and northwest of Ham Green and Feckenham. It is southwest of Bentley and southeast of the Redditch district of Webheath.

== Amenities ==
The Brook Inn is off Sillins Lane on Ham Green Lane in Elcock's Brook.

Elcock's Brook and surrounding villages such a Callow Hill, Cruise Hill, Ham Green and Feckenham are extremely rural.
