= Cruise Hill =

Coordinates: 52.272200°N 1.997249°W

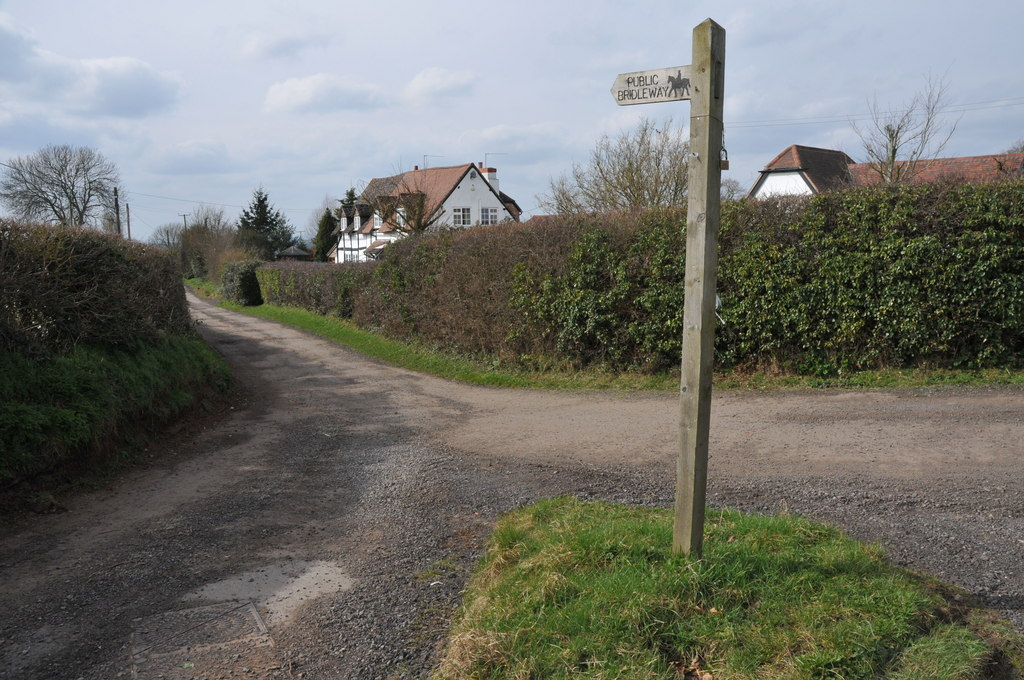
- The junction of Cruise Hill & Trickses Lane

- Location within Worcestershire
- District: Redditch
- Shire county: Worcestershire
- Region: West Midlands
- Country: England
- Sovereign state: United Kingdom
- Post town: REDDITCH
- Postcode district: B97
- Dialling code: 01527
- Police: West Mercia
- Fire: Hereford and Worcester
- Ambulance: West Midlands
- UK Parliament: Redditch

Cruise Hill is a hamlet outside Redditch, Worcestershire. It lies in between the villages of Feckenham, Callow Hill, Elcocks Brook & Ham Green.
