= Norgrove Court =

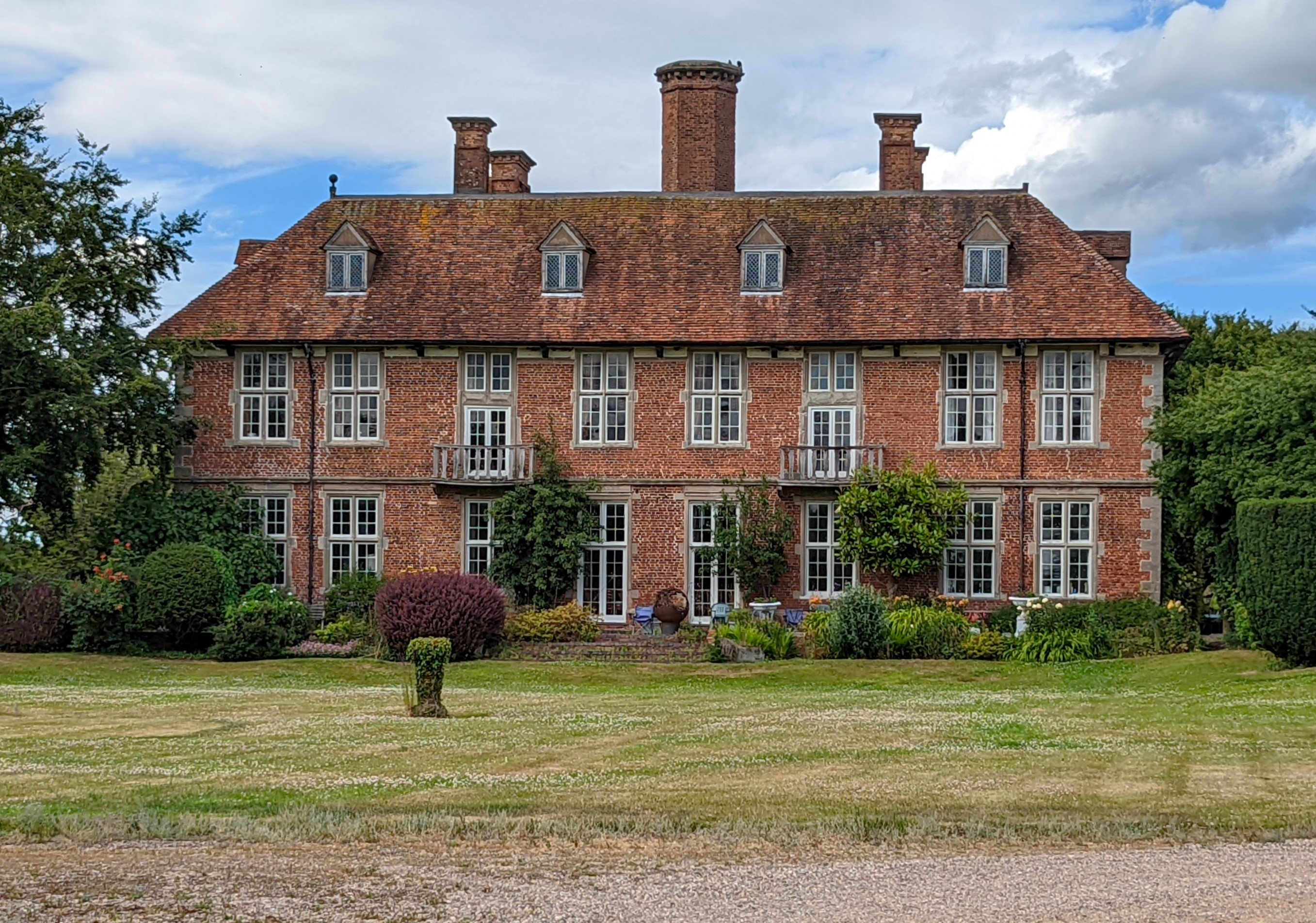
- Norgrove Court in 2022

- Location within Worcestershire

General information
- Type: Stately home
- Location: Norgrove Lane, Elcocks Brook, Callow Hill
- Coordinates: 52°17′11.53″N 1°59′27.15″W

Norgrove Court is a stately home near Redditch in North Eastern Worcestershire built in 1649. It is listed Grade I on the National Heritage List for England.

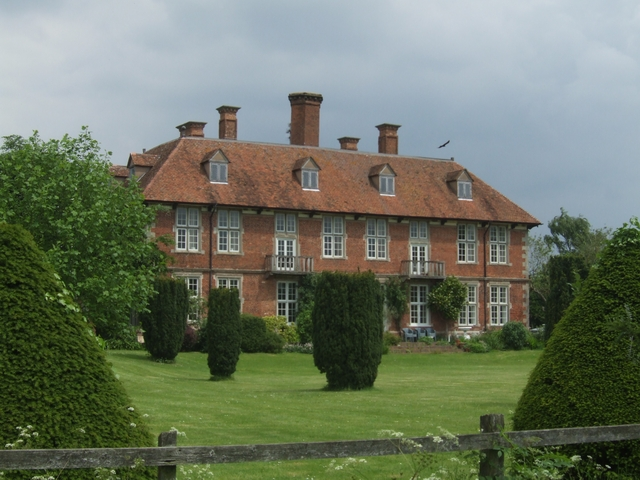
Front elevation of Norgrove Court

== Location ==
Norgrove Court is located on Norgrove Lane, in the parish of Feckenham near the hamlets of Elcock's Brook and Callow Hill, in Worcestershire.

== History ==
Built in 1649, it was nationally recorded as a listed building in 1954. The Old Cottage to the south west of Norgrove Court is listed Grade II and is the only surviving outbuilding of the main house. N Pevsner documented the house.

== Notable residence ==
- Sir Thomas Cookes (1648–1701), settled an endowments on Bromsgrove School and Worcester College, Oxford with a preference for students from Feckenham among others.
