= Ham Green, Worcestershire =

Coordinates: 52.260198°N 1.967239°W

Ham Green
- Location within Worcestershire
- OS grid reference: SP013635
- Civil parish: Feckenham
- District: Redditch
- Shire county: Worcestershire
- Region: West Midlands
- Country: England
- Sovereign state: United Kingdom
- Post town: REDDITCH
- Postcode district: B97
- Dialling code: 01527
- Police: West Mercia
- Fire: Hereford and Worcester
- Ambulance: West Midlands
- UK Parliament: Redditch

Ham Green is a hamlet outside Redditch, Worcestershire. It lies in between the villages of Feckenham, Callow Hill, Elcocks Brook & Cruise Hill. As of mid-2020, Redditch has a total population of 85568.
