= Rugby High School for Girls =

Rugby High School
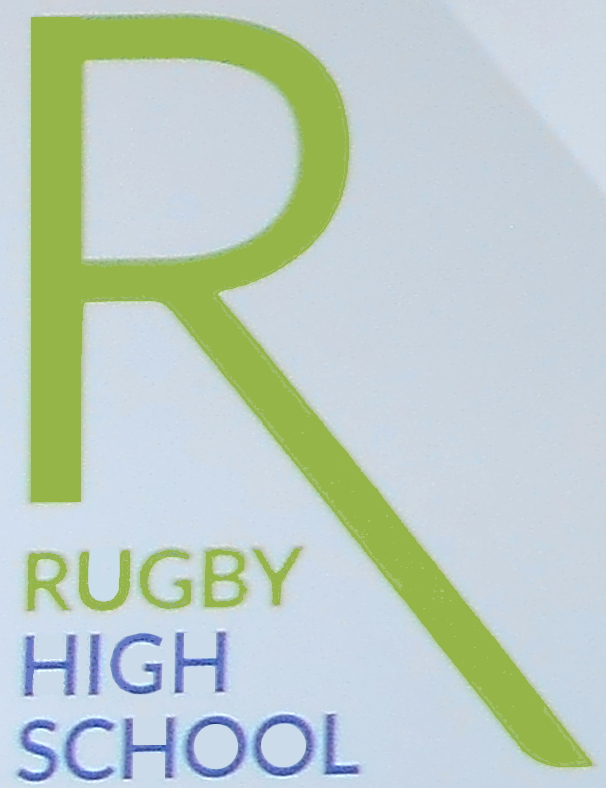

Location
- Longrood Road; Rugby, Warwickshire, CV22 7RE; England; 52.3525°N 1.286°W

Information
- Type: Grammar School; Academy
- Motto: We sets heights in our hearts.
- Established: 1903
- Founder: Olive Hands
- Local authority: Warwickshire County Council
- Department for Education URN: 136595 Tables
- Ofsted: Reports
- Head teacher: Mark Grady
- Gender: Female only (Years 7 – 11) Mixed Gender (Sixth Form)
- Age: 11 to 18
- Enrollment: 800
- Houses: Raúf, Holmes, Seacole and Glennie
- Colour: Navy Blue
- Website: www.rugbyhighschool.co.uk

Rugby High School is a selective grammar school situated in the Bilton area of Rugby, Warwickshire, England. The school motto is “She Sets Heights In Her Heart”. It takes girls aged 11–18 and boys 16–18. To attend this school, all students must have scored highly in the Eleven plus exam. It is the only state school in Warwickshire to offer Latin as a subject. In January 2023, it was rated "Good" by Ofsted.

== Admissions ==
The school accepts only girls from Year 7 – 11 and, as of the start of the 2018 academic Year, takes boys in Year 12 – 13. To be accepted into the school, pupils must take the Eleven plus exam. Candidates who live in Rugby must come in the top 120 girls and candidates who live in the wider catchment area (10 miles from the Rugby water tower) must come within the top 60.

In the 11–16 age range, the school has a four-form intake. Each year group numbers roughly 120 girls. At post 16, pupils from many other schools join the current pupils at Rugby High School to create a year group that is around double the size of 11–16 year groups.

== History ==
=== Olive Hands ===
Olive Hands was born in Rugby. After attending the University of London, she became a teacher at a school in Bromyard. She decided, at the age of 27, that girls of Rugby should be given the opportunity for a first class education. She borrowed money to set up a private school in 1903 in adjoining houses at 10 and 12 Elsee Road. It was named the Arnold High School. Later a preparatory department for younger girls was opened and this had 50 pupils by 1910. By 1909 the school had been expanded by linking it to 12 Elsee Road and there were a total of 114 pupils. By 1914 the preparatory department had moved to Eastfield House (now the Masonic Hall ). In 1916 there were 91 pupils in each half of the school.

=== The County School ===
The 1918 Education Act gave the county council responsibility for secondary education. In 1919 the W.C.C. was in the process of buying the Clifton Road site when Miss Hands decided she had to close her school. This was the only girls school in Rugby with moderate fees so the council decided it had to take over. In 1919 Miss M.M. Skues was appointed as the first council headmistress. There were 195 girls on the roll and the Elsee Road houses could hold 130. In 1921 the Clifton Road site came into use as the school playing field, replacing a rented field in Bilton Road. In 1926 Miss Skues retired and Miss Glenday took over 140 pupils in the upper school and 40 in the lower.

=== Rugby High School for Girls – Clifton Road ===
The foundation stone was laid on 2 October 1924 and the upper school moved in for the Autumn term 1927, when 'Arnold' was dropped from the name. At this point only the main assembly hall and the East quadrangle had been built and was not really large enough for the 168 girls using it. Building of the West quadrangle did not start until 1931 and was finished for September 1932. There was now room for the Preparatory department to move to the new site from Eastfield House. When Miss Glenday left to join Clifton High School, Bristol in 1933 there were 300 pupils and 19 teachers at Clifton Road. The new headmistress was Miss Briselden. In 1944 the Education Act prompted the closing of the Preparatory Department. There was no 5 year old entry that year and in 1949 the last year of girls reached 11. The spare space let the upper school increase its intake to 3 forms per year from 1944. In 1955 Miss D.M. Lindsley became headmistress and a month later it was announced that the school was going to move sites again. The Technical College was being split to form an Engineering College and a College of Further Education. The latter college was to take over the school buildings. The High School moved to its present buildings in Longrood Road, Bilton in September 1960.

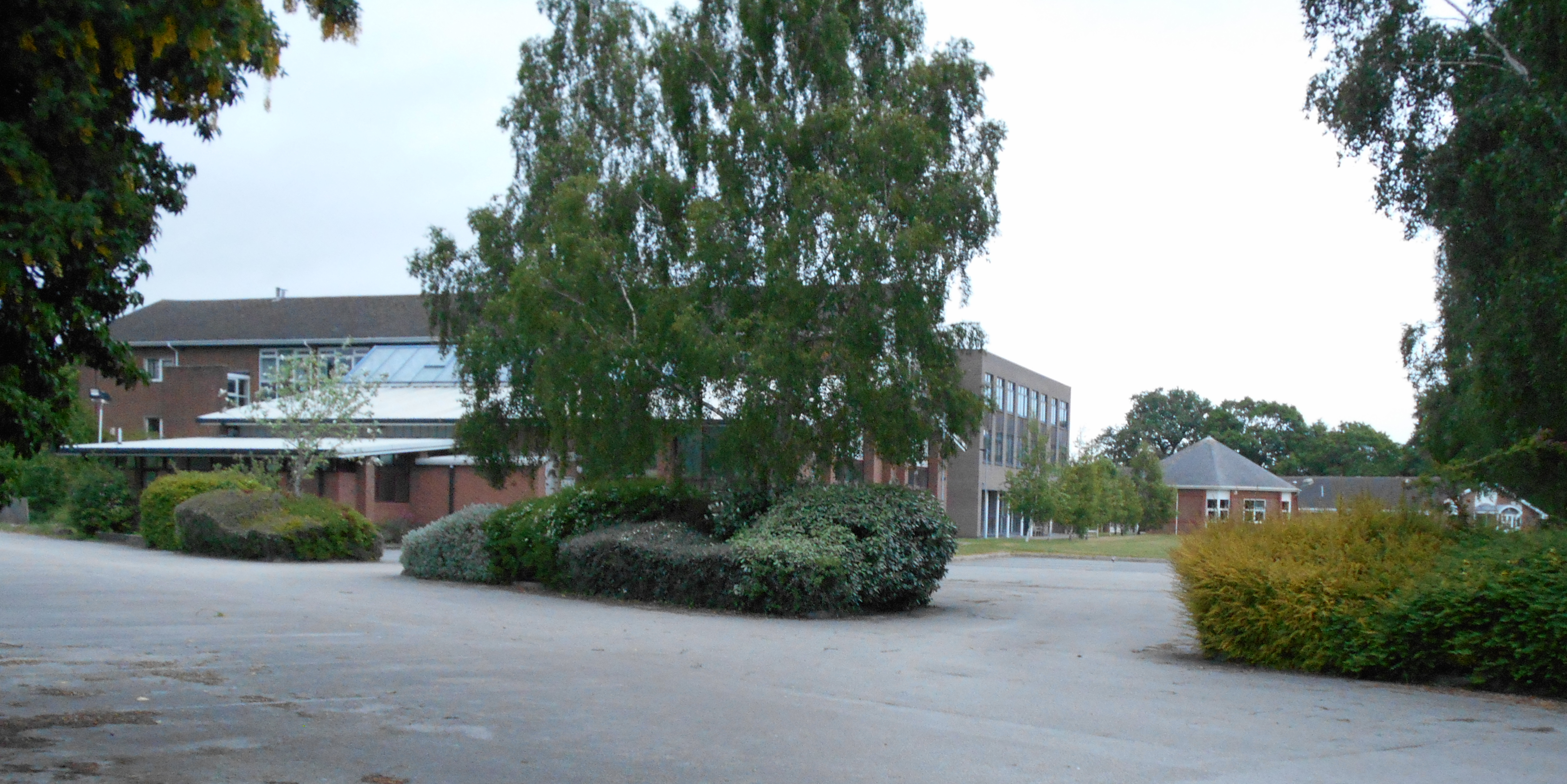
School buildings

=== Competitions ===
The school took part in the Top of the Form competition, recorded on 27 September 1951 against Wolverhampton Boys School, who they beat by 30–20. It was broadcast on Monday 8 October 1951, repeated at 9.30am on Saturday 13 October 1951. On Monday 26 November 1951 a competition was recorded against Bolton boys school, who they beat by 1 point, getting to the England final against Beckenham and Penge School for Boys, broadcast on 3 December 1951, with Diana Higgins 17, Helen Compton 14, Jocelyn Milner 13, and Elizabeth Edmundson 12. The team won the England final 27–19. In the semi-final the team was beaten 25–31 by St Dominic's Grammar School for Girls of Belfast, broadcast on Monday 31 December 1951. Jocelyn was the grand-daughter of physicist Samuel Milner FRS, and her father Chris, a physicist, worked at BTH in Rugby during the war, and briefly for the Manhattan Project in 1944 at University of California, Berkeley.

== Houses ==
The school introduced a house system during the academic year 2001–2002. The original houses, in use at least up to 1979, were named after Katharine Stewart-Murray, Duchess of Atholl, Charlotte Brontë/Emily Brontë/Anne Brontë, Edith Cavell, Marie Curie, Florence Nightingale and Queen Margaret. Each form had some members of each house. There were inter-house sports competitions and a music competition. House points were awarded for consistently good work in a particular subject.

== Old Girls' Society ==
The Old Girls’ Society was formed in October 1922. In addition to the summer reunions, there was a flourishing Old Girls Dramatic Society, and a Hockey Club. For several years, an Old Girls’ Dance was held at Christmas time but support for these events eventually dwindled and so from 1959 until 1963, the Society ceased to exist. When it was revived in 1963, Cheese and Wine parties, theatre parties and Coffee evenings were organized to attract members, for many members of the Old Girls lived in Rugby. Each year, money was raised for charities including the Margery Fry Trust for ex-prisoners, Lifeline, Multiple Sclerosis Society, Schizophrenia Society, the Hoskyn Centre and other charities.

The Society presented a music stool and engraved outdoor seat to mark the occasion of the Diamond Jubilee of the school in 1979. Church services have taken place on the special anniversaries of the school and trees have been planted at the school. Funds were raised by the Old Girls to buy a table and chair for the platform in the School Hall in memory of Miss Briselden (a former Headmistress) after her death in 1992. The Society also raised funds towards the £2000 needed to help provide furnishings and musical equipment for the Alexander Youngman Music Centre.

Shirley Wallbank has provided musical entertainment for the reunion on several occasions and Pat Petrie wrote a play portraying her schooldays (1949–1954). There was no shortage of Old Girls then to dress up in the navy tunics, square-necked blouses and the pudding basin hats that they hated when at school!

The biggest Fund raising was to restore the tiled Art Deco panel which had been rescued from the Clifton Road school just before it was demolished in 1995. The panel showing Joan of Arc can now be found on the foyer wall at the Rugby Library.

At present, the Society meets for the annual reunion in May at Rugby High School.

== Notable former pupils ==
- Laura Bettinson, singer-songwriter
- Emily Burns, singer
- Lauren Henry, rower
- Karen Leeder, Professor of Modern German Literature at the University of Oxford
- Karen Lumley (nee Allott), Conservative MP from 2010 to 2017 for Redditch (beating Jacqui Smith, the former Labour Home Secretary)
- Kate Radley, former keyboard player of Spiritualized, and former girlfriend of Jason Pierce of Spacemen 3, and wife since 1995 of Richard Ashcroft
- Dame Fiona Reynolds, Master since October 2012 of Emmanuel College, Cambridge, and former Chief Executive from 2001 until 2012 of the National Trust
- Dame Barbara Stocking (former Head Girl), former Chief Executive from May 2001 until February 2013 of Oxfam GB, and President since 2013 of Murray Edwards College, Cambridge
- Vikki Stone Composer and Comedian.
