= Ham Green =

Ham Green may refer to several places in England:

- Ham Green, North Somerset, a hamlet
- Ham Green, Wiltshire, a hamlet
- Ham Green, Worcestershire, a hamlet near Redditch
