= Upper Bentley =

Village in Worcestershire, England

Coordinates: 52.29474°N 2.009683°W

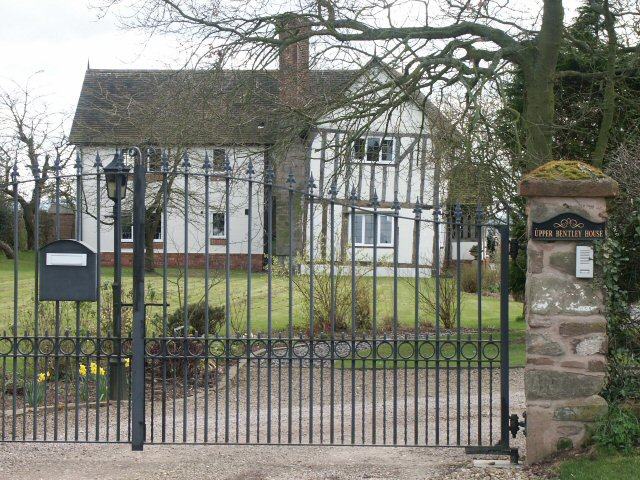
- Upper Bentley House

- Location within Worcestershire
- OS grid reference: SO994662
- Civil parish: Bentley Pauncefoot
- District: Bromsgrove
- Shire county: Worcestershire
- Region: West Midlands
- Country: England
- Sovereign state: United Kingdom
- Post town: REDDITCH
- Postcode district: B97
- Dialling code: 01527
- Police: West Mercia
- Fire: Hereford and Worcester
- Ambulance: West Midlands
- UK Parliament: Bromsgrove

Upper Bentley is a village in Worcestershire, England. It is located between the towns of Redditch and Bromsgrove. It is near the villages of Elcocks Brook, Bentley and Callow Hill. It is part of the civil parish of Bentley Pauncefoot; the parish population was 375 in 2021.

== History ==
The name Bentley derives from the Old English beonetlēah meaning 'bent grass wood/clearing'.

Bentley Manor dates back to before 1300 when it stood in Feckenham Forest. Rights of warren were granted to a Grimbald Pauncefoote in the manor of Bentley in 1281 for rabbits.

The Bentley Estate came into being when William Hemming bought the land from Mr. John Cookes in Approximately 1830. Upon Williams death in 1848 the land and property went to his son Richard Hemming. Richard died in 1891, leaving the Estate to his Daughter Maude. Maude married a Scotsman named George Clark Cheape. Mrs Cheape (known as the Squire of Bentley) was known for her love of hunting and kept a pack of Beagles in the village. After losing her son, who drowned in 1917, Maude died in 1919 leaving the Estate to her Grandson Leslie. Colonel Gray Cheape (as Leslie was formally known) died in 1991 and the estate passed into the hands of his grandchildren.

Maude Ellis, the youngest daughter of Mrs. Cheape, lived here until her death in 1942, the house was then taken over by the War Office where prisoners of war were billeted. Unfortunately the building had to be pulled down in the 1950s as the structure had suffered from dry rot.

The village school was built in 1882 and owned by the estate. It closed in 1960 and the children had to be educated at the larger schools in Redditch. The building was given to the village in 1962 following an extension to include a large hall and kitchen and Colonel Gray Cheape officially declared the Village Hall as open.

In 2009, Bentley Village Hall was refurbished thanks to a TV appeal and money from The People's Millions. It was officially opened in December by Bentley's longest-standing resident, Diana Gibbs.
