= Callow Hill, Worcestershire =

Area of Redditch, Worcestershire, England

Coordinates: 52.282731°N 1.967239°W

Callow Hill
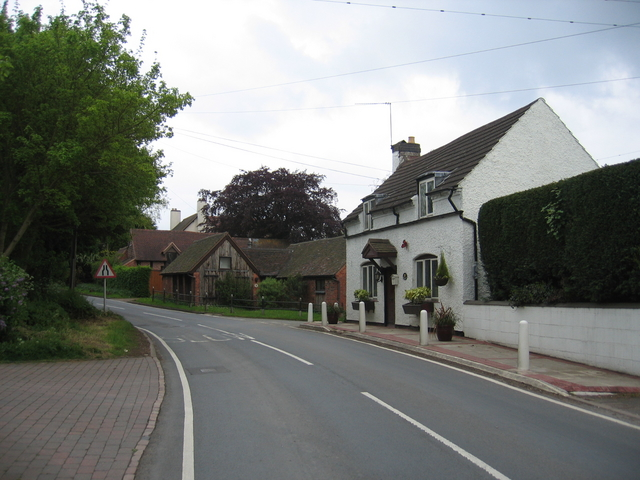
- View of 16th Century Cottage, on corner of Love Lyne and Callow Hill Lane.

- Location within Worcestershire
- District: Redditch
- Shire county: Worcestershire
- Region: West Midlands
- Country: England
- Sovereign state: United Kingdom
- Post town: REDDITCH
- Postcode district: B97
- Dialling code: 01527
- Police: West Mercia
- Fire: Hereford and Worcester
- Ambulance: West Midlands
- UK Parliament: Redditch

Callow Hill is an area of Redditch, in Worcestershire, England. Other villages nearby include Astwood Bank, Feckenham, Cookhill, and Webheath.

== History ==
Callow Hill can be traced back to the 16th century when small cottages were built. In the mid-1600s, further expansion came, as cottages, which still stand today, were built. Callow Hill stayed the same throughout the 18th and 19th century, unlike nearby Feckenham and Redditch, Callow Hill did not have needle factories. At the beginning of the 20th century, the Callow Hill & Walkwood Golf Club was founded, members could play on a small course, the exact location is not known, but it is thought to be in between Love Lyne and Callow Hill Lane, due to the way the hill is formed. The Redditch Golf Club was founded in 1913 on the site and in the late 1920s moved to a larger site in Redditch Town Centre. In the early 1970s, Redditch New Town Development Corporation planned to build the Bromsgrove Highway as part of the planned New Town highway infrastructure, it was constructed through the Golf Course. It was decided that Redditch Golf Club would be moved back to Callow Hill, but on green-field land adjacent to Upper Grinsty Farm (Now known as Morton Stanley Park). The remainder of the course in the town was renamed Pitcheroak Golf course, a municipal course for anyone to use, whereas the Callow Hill site club remained for private members. Redditch Golf Club relocated in 1972 to Lower Grinsty Lane. Part of Marlpit Lane was covered over with earth for the course, and the rest of the lane was severed by Windmill Drive. Part of Green Lane, to the west of Morton Stanley Park, was by passed as the existing 16th century lane could not cope with the traffic. In the early 1980s, development began for a 'Victorian style village', the original part of the estate followed the Valley, which has later been interrupted by further development. The estate was officially opened on 7 September 1984. Since further development came, the former Riding School was bought in the mid-1990s and many homes were built. Based in Callow Hill is a wine company, Callow Hill Country Wine which has its headquarters on Brookhouse Lane in the village.

== Morton Stanley Park ==
Morton Stanley Park is a public park located to the north of Callow Hill. It was opened in 1986 and is run by Redditch Borough Council, however, it is not owned by them. The land today that makes up Morton Stanley Park, was once Upper Grinsty Farm, which was bought in 1913 by William Morton Stanley. Stanley was a rich factory owner and retired to Upper Grinsty and lived the rest of his life there. In 1921, he edited his will, which resulted in Upper Grinsty Farm being given to the people of Redditch and Webheath. Stanley died three years later at the age of 84, little did he know his land would not be open to the public until over 60 years later. Upper Grinsty Farmhouse, became derelict and run-down until it was finally demolished in 1959. 5 years later when Redditch became a New Town, the Development Corporation wanted to build a housing estate on his land, however, these plans were halted by the Headless Cross Residents Association. In 1978, the far-eastern fringes of Stanley's land were in fact built on, but Redditch Council gave council owned land to the west of the estate to compensate. Windmill Drive was built and after 60 years of waiting the park opened to the public with two carparks, one in the east in Headless Cross and one in the west in Callow Hill.

== The Callow Hill Windmill ==
The Windmill referred to in the name of Windmill Drive was situated on the top of Callow Hill. The following information is taken from: 'Windmills in Shropshire Hereford and Worcester': Wilfred A Seaby, Arthur C Smith. Stevenage Museum Publications.

REDDITCH (FECKENHAM) SP 027647. Brick Tower Mill on Callow Hill, Walkwood Common. Advertised in Birmingham Gazette (23 December 1833) for sale and as 'newly erected'. Again to be sold with sails, gearing, stones and other machinery complete in the Midland Counties Herald (24 Feb 1848). A brick portion not very high was standing about 1855. Today the site is marked by a semicircle of trees and a small paddock adjoining the extended meeting house Windmill Cottage; a Peak runner stone was on the site in January 1983. Parts from the Callow Hill Windmill are buried in the grounds of Windmill Cottage, in the paddock.

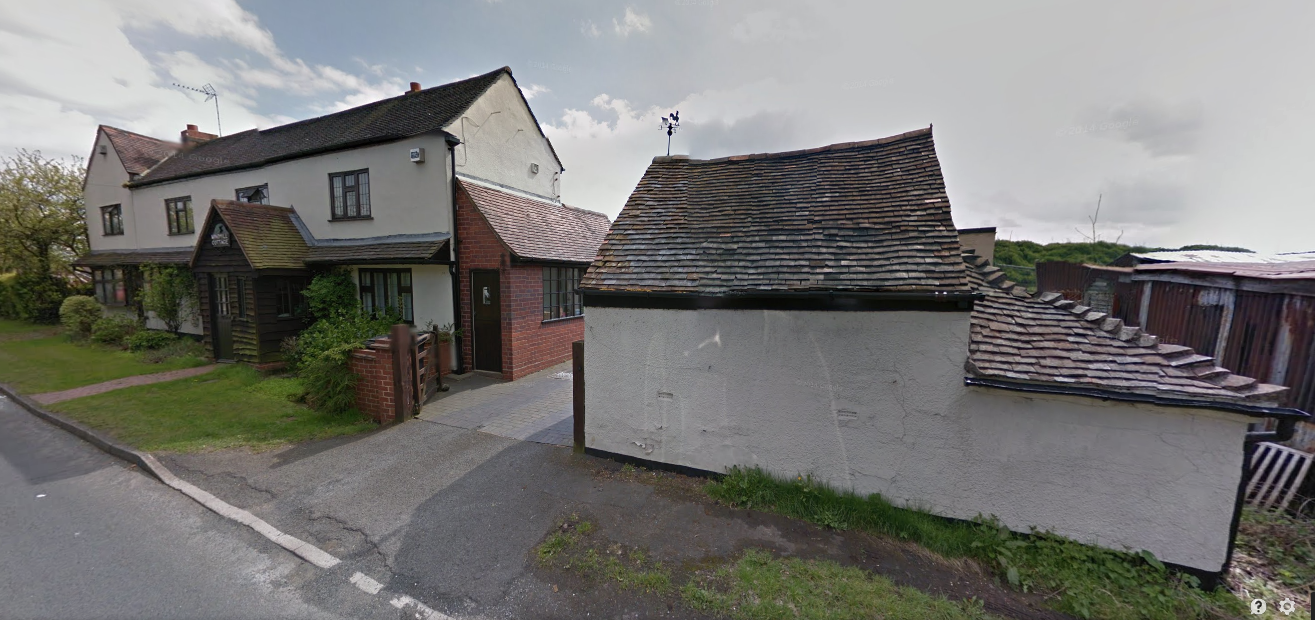
Windmill Cottage, Callow Hill, Redditch

The semicircle of trees is still in place, but the approaching short 'lane' has changed at least one of its hedgerows (from Google maps). The position of the windmill is visible on old (1884–1891) O.S. maps. The correct grid reference is SP028648.

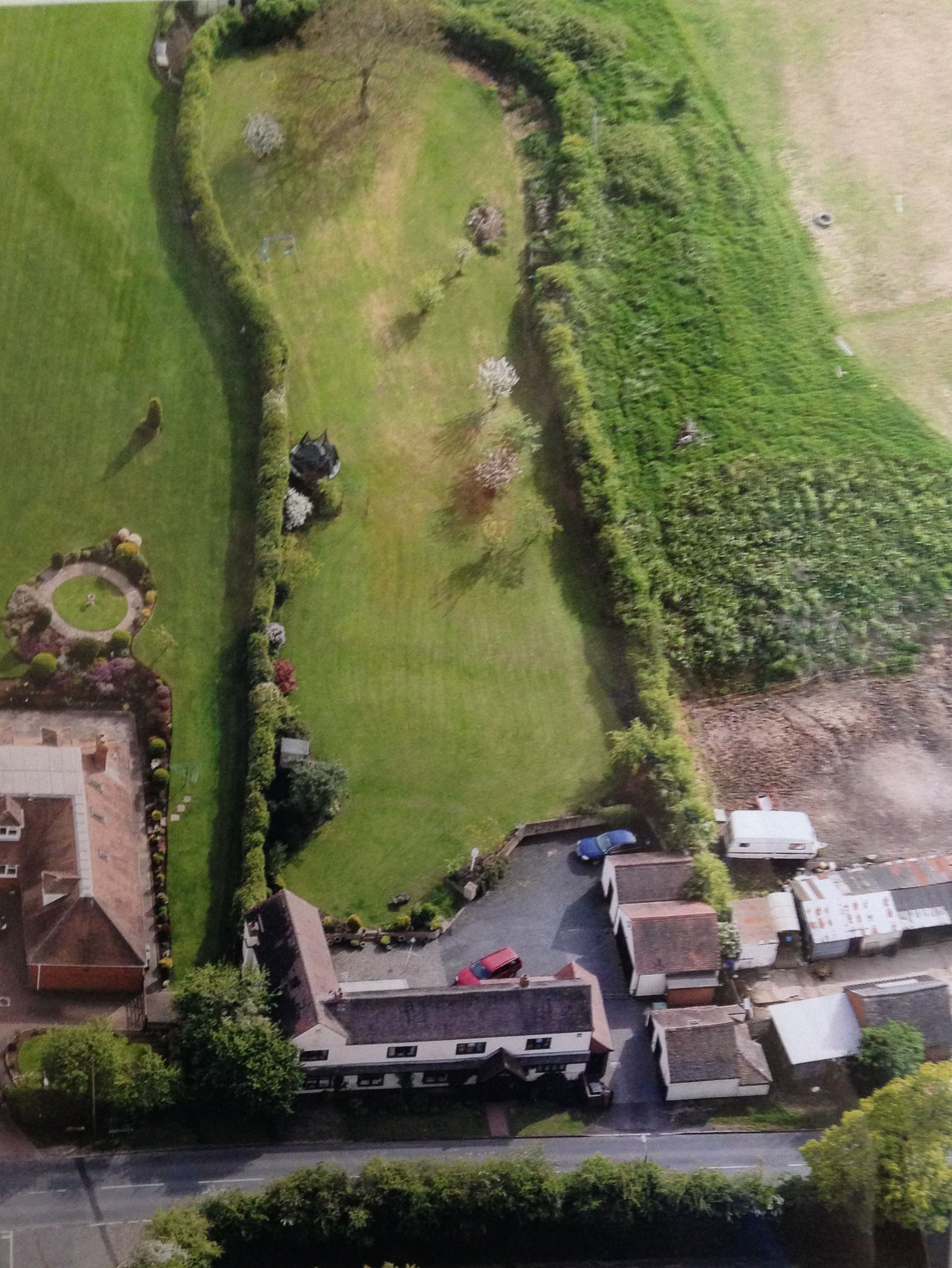
Windmill Cottage Satellite (hedgerow visible)

== The Gazebo and village ==
The Gazebo, on Foxholes Lane, is Callow Hill's village hall. It is also used as a polling station. Very occasionally village meetings are held but only a maximum of twenty-thirty people can attend because the Gazebo is so small. Situated near the Gazebo is the Callow Hill village pond, which is surrounded by trees and greenery. There are two major roads travelling through Callow Hill, Foxholes Lane and Callow Hill Lane, which is the major linking Redditch to Hanbury, Droitwich Spa, Pershore, Worcester and, the M5.

== Politics ==
Callow Hill falls within the parliamentary constituency of Redditch which as of the 2024 General Election is represented by Chris Bloore (Labour). The constituency was previously represented by Rachel Maclean, and former Home Secretary, Jacqui Smith (Labour).

=== Redditch Borough Council ===
Callow Hill is part of the Webheath and Callow Hill ward of Redditch Borough Council; in which three councillors are elected in rotation for four years each. At the 2024 Redditch local election, Claire Davies (Green), Matthew Dormer (Conservative) and Gemma Monaco (Conservative) are the current Borough councillors.

=== Worcestershire County Council ===
Callow Hill is part of Redditch South electoral division of Worcestershire County Council, which is represented by two councillors, Roger Bennett and Sue Eacock (both Reform UK).

== Notable residents ==
- Zoë Lister – an actress best known for her role in Hollyoaks, grew up in Callow Hill.
- Paul Tait – footballer
