= Karen Lumley =

British politician (1964–2023)

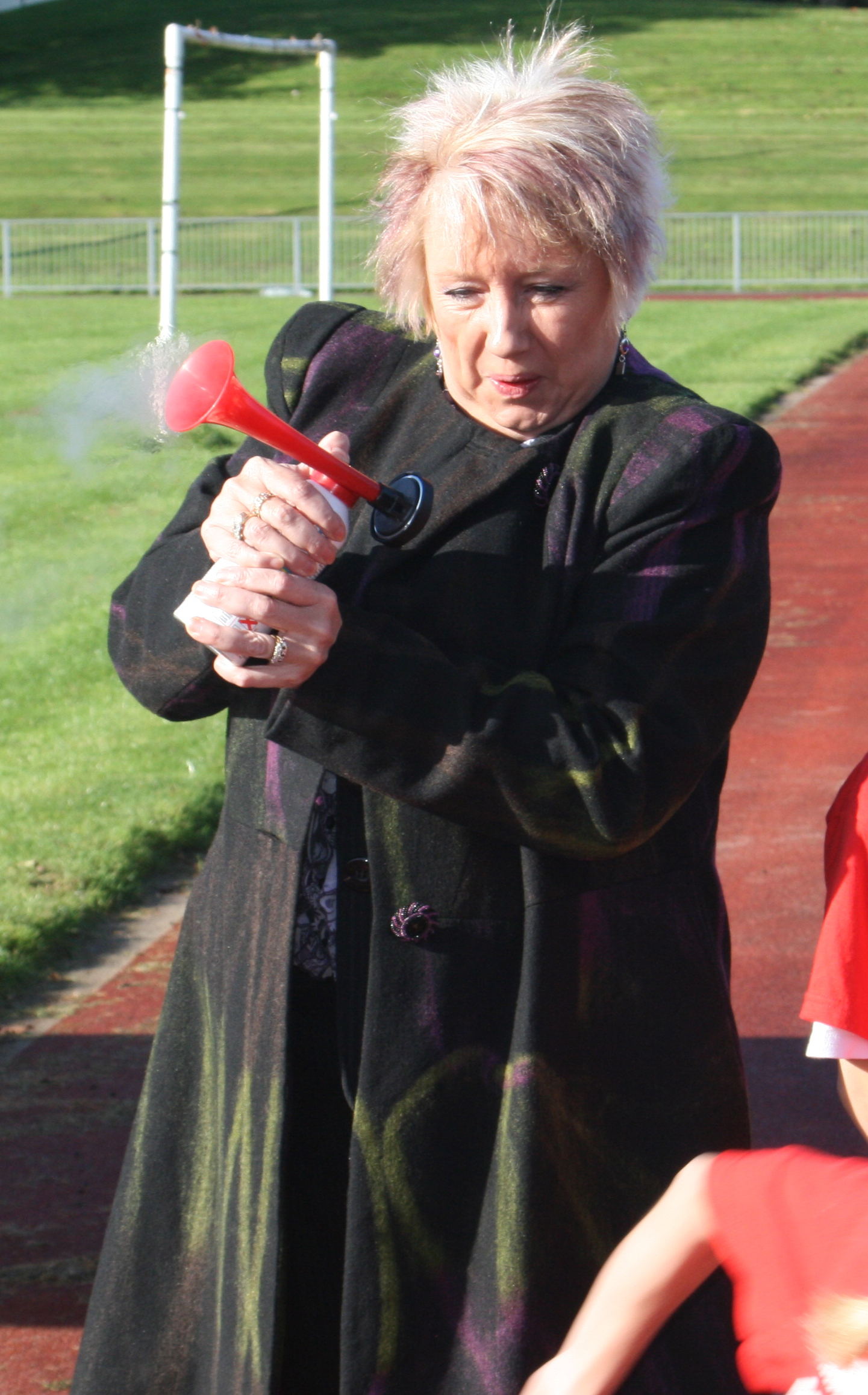
- Lumley in 2010

Member of Parliament for Redditch
- In office 6 May 2010 – 3 May 2017
- Preceded by: Jacqui Smith
- Succeeded by: Rachel Maclean

Personal details
- Born: 28 March 1964 Barnsley, West Riding of Yorkshire, England
- Died: 25 May 2023 (aged 59)
- Party: Conservative
- Spouse: Richard Lumley (m. 1984)
- Children: 2
- Education: Rugby High School for Girls; East Warwickshire College

Karen Elizabeth Lumley (28 March 1964 – 25 May 2023) was a British Conservative politician and the Member of Parliament (MP) for Redditch in Worcestershire from 2010 to 2017.

== Early life and education ==
She was born Karen Elizabeth Allott in Barnsley on 28 March 1964, to Derek and Sylvia Allott. She grew up in the county of Warwickshire, in the town of Rugby. Her early education was at the Rugby High School for Girls, and subsequently the East Warwickshire College.

== Political career ==
Lumley was the deputy chair of the Welsh Young Conservatives from 1986 to 1987, and the group leader of the district of Wrexham Maelor from 1991 to 1996. She also served on Clwyd County Council between 1993 and 1996, and on Redditch Borough Council from 2001 to 2003.

Lumley unsuccessfully contested the Delyn constituency in 1997 and at National Assembly level in 1999. In both the general elections of 2001 and 2005, she unsuccessfully contested the constituency of Redditch before gaining the seat at the general election of 2010, defeating the former Labour Home Secretary Jacqui Smith.

Lumley was one of 175 MPs to vote against the Marriage (Same Sex Couples) Act 2013 in March 2013, which legalised same sex marriage in England and Wales.

Lumley had said that while she supported civil partnerships, she had felt that the bill would redefine the meaning of marriage and that her decision would be supported by the majority of her constituents. She held her seat in the election of May 2015.

Lumley indicated her support for voting to leave the European Union in the EU Referendum in March 2016. She commented that the move would regain the sovereignty of the United Kingdom.

In the House of Commons Lumley sat on the Finance Committee as of July 2015. She had previously been part of the Welsh Affairs Select Committee and the Transport Select Committee. She was also a Parliamentary Private Secretary in the Department of Health.

Lumley did not seek re-election as an MP at the general election of 2017 due to ill health.

== Personal life and death ==
After becoming an MP, she lived in the Brockhill area of Redditch. She was married to Richard Lumley, a geologist, and had two children.

Lumley died on 25 May 2023, at the age of 59.

Parliament of the United Kingdom
Preceded by Jacqui Smith	Member of Parliament for Redditch; 2010–2017	Succeeded by Rachel Maclean
