= Rachel Maclean, Baroness Maclean of Redditch =

British politician (born 1965)

The Right Honourable The Baroness Maclean of Redditch
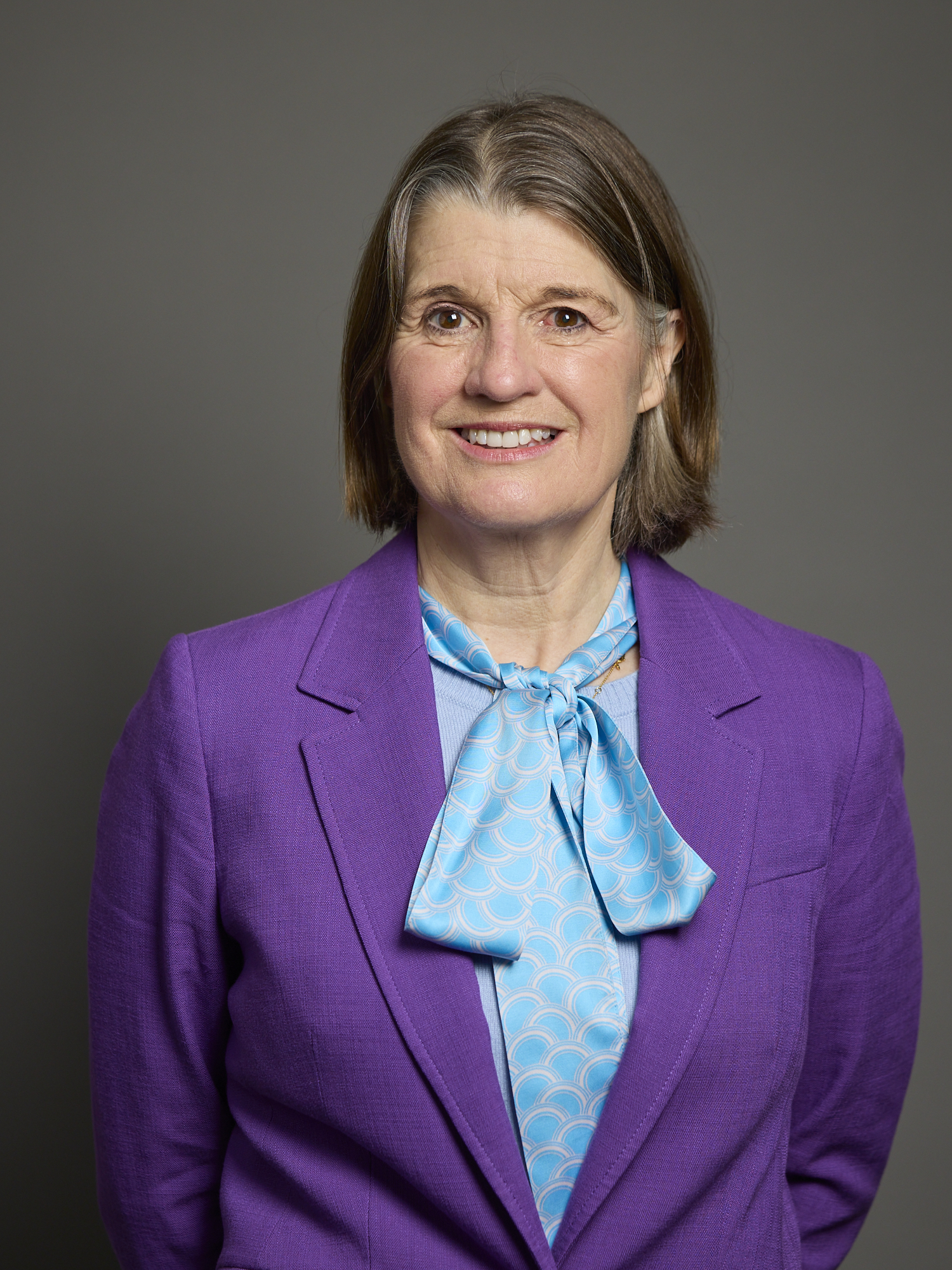
- Official portrait, 2025

Minister of State for Housing and Planning
- In office 7 February 2023 – 13 November 2023
- Prime Minister: Rishi Sunak
- Preceded by: Lucy Frazer
- Succeeded by: Lee Rowley

Minister of State for Victims and Vulnerability
- In office 7 September 2022 – 28 October 2022
- Prime Minister: Liz Truss
- Preceded by: Office established
- Succeeded by: Edward Argar

Parliamentary Under-Secretary of State for Safeguarding
- In office 16 September 2021 – 6 July 2022
- Prime Minister: Boris Johnson
- Preceded by: Victoria Atkins
- Succeeded by: Amanda Solloway

Parliamentary Under-Secretary of State for Transport
- In office 13 February 2020 – 16 September 2021
- Prime Minister: Boris Johnson
- Preceded by: Paul Maynard
- Succeeded by: Trudy Harrison

Member of the House of Lords
- Lord Temporal
- Life peerage 5 February 2025

Member of Parliament for Redditch
- In office 8 June 2017 – 30 May 2024
- Preceded by: Karen Lumley
- Succeeded by: Chris Bloore

Personal details
- Born: Rachel Helen Cooke; 3 October 1965 (age 61) Madras, Madras State, India
- Party: Conservative
- Spouse: David Maclean (m. 1992)
- Children: 4
- Education: St Hugh's College, Oxford, Aston University
- Website: www.rachelmaclean.uk

Rachel Helen Maclean, Baroness Maclean of Redditch (née Cooke; born 3 October 1965) is a British politician who was the Member of Parliament for Redditch in Worcestershire from 2017 to 2024, and currently serves as a Conservative peer in the House of Lords. A member of the Conservative Party, she previously served as Minister in the Department for Communities and Local Government, Department for Transport and Home Office.

Maclean served as Parliamentary Private Secretary (PPS) to the Chancellor of the Exchequer, Sajid Javid, from September 2019 until February 2020. Prime Minister Boris Johnson appointed her Parliamentary Under Secretary of State at the Department for Transport in February 2020. She then became Parliamentary Under-Secretary of State for Safeguarding from September 2021, before resigning from the position during the July 2022 government crisis. She then served under Liz Truss as Minister of State for Victims and Vulnerability from September to October 2022. She became a Vice Chairman of the Conservative Party in November 2022, and in February 2023 she was appointed Housing Minister by Rishi Sunak before leaving government in the November 2023 reshuffle.

== Early life and education ==
Rachel Helen Cooke was born on 3 October 1965 in Madras (now Chennai), India, to David and Anthea Cooke. She attended Tudor Grange School and Solihull Sixth Form College in Solihull, West Midlands. She studied Experimental Psychology at St Hugh's College, Oxford and obtained a master's degree in Work and Occupational Psychology at Aston University. After graduation, she entered a fast-track management scheme in 1989 at HSBC which involved working in Australia, Japan and China. In 2005, Maclean co-founded Packt, a publishing company specialising in information technology with her husband, David.

== Parliamentary career ==
=== House of Commons ===
Maclean contested the Birmingham Northfield seat in the general election of 2015, finishing second behind the incumbent Labour Party MP Richard Burden, who won a majority of 2,509 votes.

She voted for the United Kingdom (UK) to remain within the European Union (EU) in the June 2016 membership referendum.

In April 2017, Karen Lumley, Conservative MP for Redditch, announced that she would not contest her seat in the June snap general election due to ill health. The following month, Maclean was selected to be the Conservative candidate in the election. She won the seat at the election with 23,652 votes and a majority of 7,363 (16.3%). In Parliament, she sat on the Business, Energy and Industrial Strategy Committee between September 2017 and June 2018.

In 2017, Maclean co-chaired Andy Street's successful campaign to become the Mayor of the West Midlands. In July, in her maiden parliamentary speech, she commented that her main priority would be 'to fight to protect and strengthen local health services', especially the Alexandra Hospital in Redditch.

In February 2018, Maclean was elected to be the chair of the All-Party Parliamentary Group (APPG) on Women in Parliament. She is also the chair of the APPG on Carers and the APPG on Endangered Species. The following month, she was appointed as a Parliamentary Private Secretary (PPS) within the Home Office.

In March 2019, Maclean voted for then Prime Minister Theresa May's Brexit withdrawal agreement. She supported Michael Gove in the 2019 Conservative Party leadership election. In September 2019, she was appointed as PPS to the Chancellor of the Exchequer, Sajid Javid.

Maclean was re-elected at the 2019 general election with an increased vote share of 63.3% and an increased majority of 16,036.

She was the Parliamentary Under Secretary of State at the Department for Transport in the Second Johnson ministry since February 2020.

In September 2021, following the withdrawal of foreign defence forces from Afghanistan and takeover by the Taliban, Maclean was appointed Parliamentary Under Secretary of State (Minister for Safeguarding) at the Home Office. She succeeded Victoria Atkins, who simultaneously became Minister of State for Prisons and Probation at the Ministry of Justice. Both ministers adopted Government responsibility for the Afghan resettlement programme and Operation Warm Welcome.

On 6 July 2022, Maclean resigned from her position as Parliamentary Under-Secretary of State for Safeguarding in protest at Prime Minister Boris Johnson's leadership. Maclean backed Sajid Javid, then Kemi Badenoch, and finally Liz Truss in the July–September 2022 Conservative Party leadership election.

She was a member of the Women and Equalities Committee between November 2022 and May 2023.

In 2023 she was appointed Minister of State for Housing and Planning by Rishi Sunak before leaving government in the November 2023 reshuffle.

In December 2023, she was accused by political opponents of transphobia after sharing a social media post about Melissa Poulton, the Green Party candidate for the Bromsgrove constituency. The police later reversed their decision to record Maclean's action as a "non-crime hate incident", and therefore removed all mention of it from their records.

=== House of Lords ===
In December 2024, Maclean was appointed to join the House of Lords as a life peer as part of the 2024 Political Peerages. She was created Baroness Maclean of Redditch, of Hanbury in the County of Worcestershire on 5 February 2025. She formerly served as Director of Strategy to the Leader of the Opposition, Kemi Badenoch.

On 18 June 2025, she delivered a speech to the Conservative Women's Organisation, saying "We’ve done the mea culpas, we’ve done the apologies, we’ve done all that" regarding the reaction to the 2024 general election.

== Personal life ==
She married David Maclean in 1992. They have three sons and one daughter. Maclean lives in Redditch in Worcestershire with her family.

Parliament of the United Kingdom
Preceded by Karen Lumley	Member of Parliament for Redditch; 2017–2024	Succeeded by Chris Bloore
Political offices
Preceded by Lucy Frazer	Minister of State for Housing and Planning; 2023	Succeeded by Lee Rowley
Party political offices
New title	Vice Chairman of the Conservative Party; 2022–2023	Succeeded by Matt Vickers
