= Jacqui Smith =

British politician (born 1962)

The Right Honourable The Baroness Smith of Malvern PC
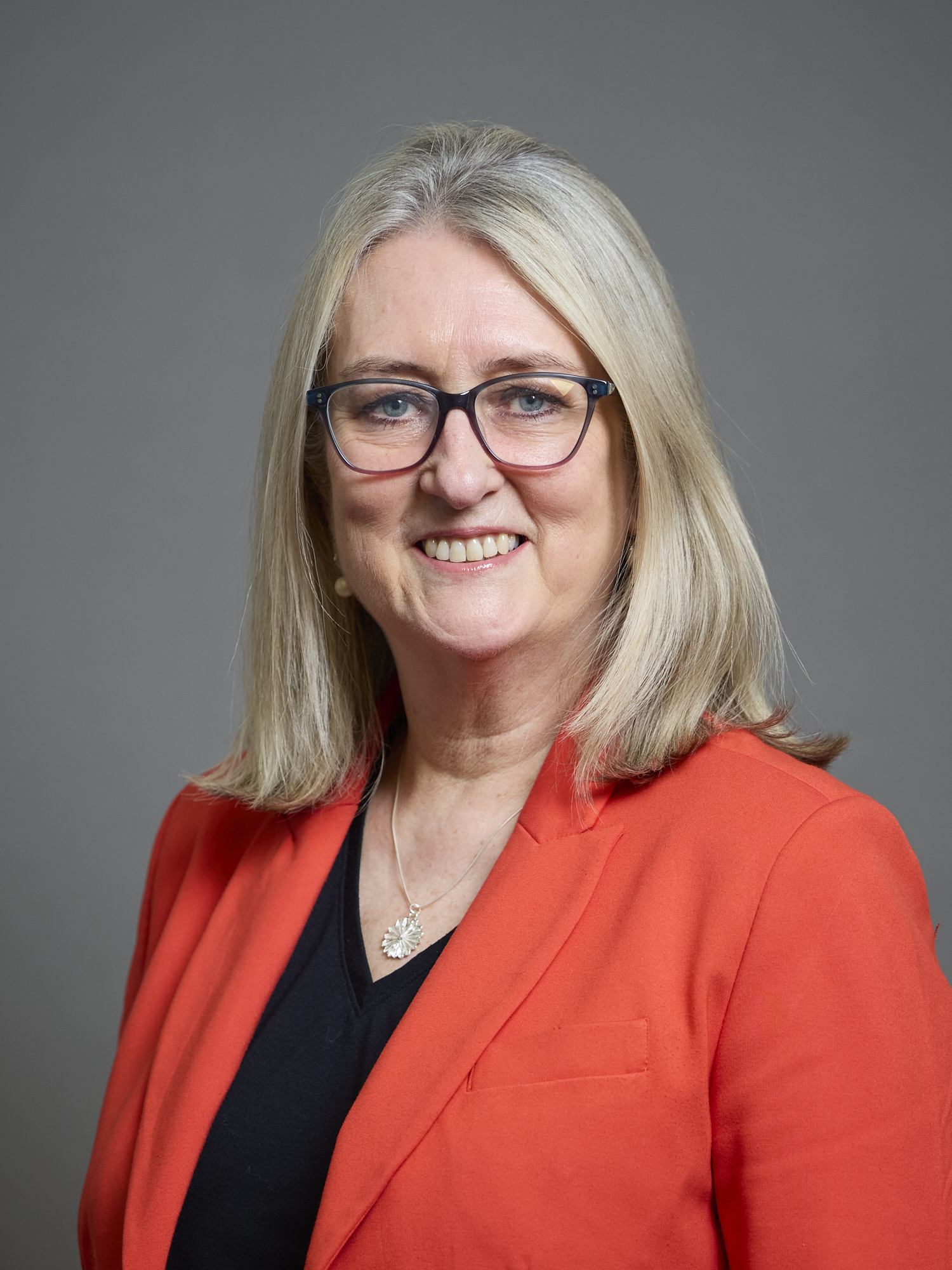
- Official portrait, 2025

Minister of State for Skills
- Incumbent
- Assumed office 6 July 2024
- Prime Minister: Keir Starmer; Andy Burnham
- Preceded by: Luke Hall

Home Secretary
- In office 28 June 2007 – 5 June 2009
- Prime Minister: Gordon Brown
- Preceded by: John Reid
- Succeeded by: Alan Johnson

Chief Whip of the House of Commons Parliamentary Secretary to the Treasury
- In office 5 May 2006 – 28 June 2007
- Prime Minister: Tony Blair
- Preceded by: Hilary Armstrong
- Succeeded by: Geoff Hoon
Junior ministerial offices 1999‍–‍2006
Minister of State for Women and Equalities
In office 4 March 2025 – 21 July 2026
Prime Minister	Keir Starmer
Preceded by	Anneliese Dodds
Succeeded by	Stephen Timms
Minister of State for Schools and Learners
In office 6 May 2005 – 5 May 2006
Prime Minister	Tony Blair
Preceded by	Stephen Twigg
Succeeded by	Jim Knight
Minister of State for Industry and the Regions
In office 13 June 2003 – 6 May 2005
Prime Minister	Tony Blair
Preceded by	Brian Wilson
Succeeded by	Alun Michael
Deputy Minister for Women
In office 13 June 2003 – 6 May 2005
Prime Minister	Tony Blair
Preceded by	Barbara Roche
Succeeded by	Meg Munn
Minister of State for Health Services
In office 11 June 2001 – 13 June 2003
Prime Minister	Tony Blair
Preceded by	John Denham
Succeeded by	Rosie Winterton
Parliamentary Under-Secretary of State for Education and Employment
In office 29 July 1999 – 10 June 2001
Prime Minister	Tony Blair
Preceded by	Charles Clarke
Succeeded by	John Healey

Member of the House of Lords
- Lord Temporal
- Life peerage 18 July 2024

Member of Parliament for Redditch
- In office 1 May 1997 – 12 April 2010
- Preceded by: Constituency established
- Succeeded by: Karen Lumley

Personal details
- Born: Jacqueline Jill Smith; 3 November 1962 (age 64) Malvern, Worcestershire, England
- Party: Labour
- Spouse: Richard Timney (m. 1987; sep. 2019)
- Children: 2
- Education: Hertford College, Oxford (BA); Worcester College of Higher Education (PGCE)

Jacqueline Jill Smith, Baroness Smith of Malvern PC (born 3 November 1962) is a British politician, broadcaster and life peer who has been serving as Minister of State for Skills since 2024. A member of the Labour Party, she was Member of Parliament (MP) for Redditch from 1997 to 2010. Smith previously served as Home Secretary under Gordon Brown from 2007 to 2009, and was the first woman to hold the position.

Smith was born and raised in Malvern, Worcestershire. She attended Hertford College, Oxford, before training to become a teacher at Worcester College of Higher Education and having a career as an economics and business studies teacher. She was elected for Redditch at the 1997 general election. She joined the government in 1999 and served in a series of ministerial positions under Prime Minister Tony Blair. In the 2006 cabinet reshuffle she was promoted to Chief Whip.

Following the formation of the Brown ministry in 2007, Smith became the first female Home Secretary. She resigned as Home Secretary in June 2009 following her involvement in the parliamentary expenses scandal in which she had falsely claimed that a room in her sister's house was her main home; she was also the subject of controversy after it emerged that her husband had used taxpayer money to purchase pornographic videos. Smith, one of the highest profile figures involved in the scandal, then lost her seat as MP for Redditch in the 2010 general election. Between leaving the House of Commons and rejoining the government in 2024, she remained in public life as a political pundit and took up roles in various other sectors, such as health and media.

== Early life and career ==
Jacqueline Jill Smith was born on 3 November 1962 in Malvern, Worcestershire. She attended Dyson Perrins High School in Malvern. Her parents were teachers, and both Labour councillors, although her mother briefly joined the Social Democratic Party. Her local MP, Conservative backbencher Michael Spicer, recalled in Parliament in 2003 how he had first met her when he addressed the sixth form at The Chase School, where her mother was a teacher; he joked: "So great was my eloquence that she immediately rushed off and joined the Labour Party." Smith obtained a place to study philosophy, politics and economics at Hertford College, Oxford.

After graduating, she moved to London and worked as a researcher for Labour MP Terry Davis.

Deciding she wanted a career outside politics, Smith moved out of London and gained a Postgraduate Certificate in Education from Worcester College of Higher Education. Working as a school teacher, she taught economics at Arrow Vale High School in Redditch from 1986 to 1988 and at Worcester Sixth Form College, before becoming head of economics and General National Vocational Qualification co-ordinator at Haybridge High School, Hagley, in 1990. During this time Smith held positions in the local Labour party and campaigned on behalf of the party.

Smith worked as secretary of the National Organisation of Labour Students and describes herself as having a "feminist background". She served on Redditch Borough Council from 1991 to 1996, where she chaired the development committee. Smith was unsuccessful in an attempt to be elected as (Labour) MP for the safe Conservative seat of Mid Worcestershire in the 1992 general election, despite achieving a 4.9% swing. In early 1997 she was identified by The Independent as a potential future cabinet member.

== Political career ==
=== Member of Parliament ===
Smith was selected through an all-women shortlist as the Labour candidate for Redditch, a new constituency created following a boundary review. She won the seat in the 1997 general election, as part of a then-record number of female MPs elected to the House of Commons.

Smith entered the Government in July 1999, as a parliamentary under-secretary of state at the Department for Education and Employment, working with the Minister for School Standards Estelle Morris. She then became a Minister of State at the Department of Health following the 2001 general election. She was appointed as deputy Minister for Women in 2003, working alongside Secretary of State Patricia Hewitt. In this role she published the government's proposals for same-sex civil partnerships, a system designed to offer same-sex couples an opportunity to gain legal recognition for their relationships with an associated set of rights and responsibilities.

In the 2005 general election Smith had a majority of just 2,716 (6.7% of the vote), owing to boundary changes.

=== Minister for Schools ===
Following the 2005 general election, Smith was appointed Minister of State for Schools at the Department for Education and Skills, replacing Stephen Twigg who had lost his seat. Teacher trade union sources stated that Smith "talked to us on our level".

=== Chief Whip ===
In the 2006 cabinet reshuffle Smith was appointed as the government's Chief Whip. In a period when supporters of Gordon Brown were pushing Prime Minister Tony Blair to resign, she was successfully able to calm the situation down. The BBC's political editor Nick Robinson described her as being effective at "making peace between the warring Blair and Brown factions".

Smith was regarded as a loyal Blairite during Tony Blair's premiership, a position reflected in her voting record, and she was brought to tears by Blair's farewell appearance in the House of Commons.

=== Home Secretary ===
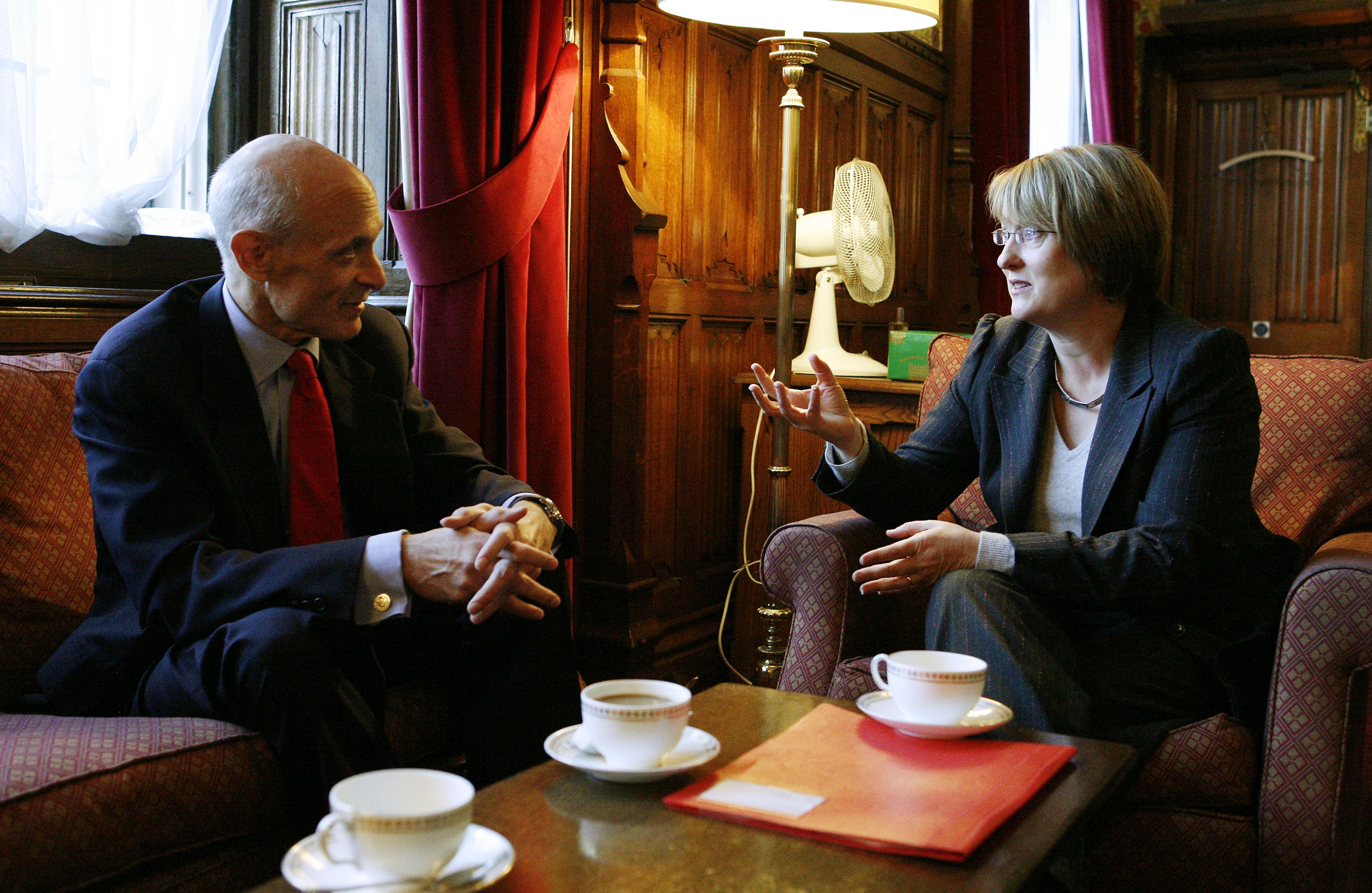
Smith with United States secretary of homeland security Michael Chertoff in 2007

In Gordon Brown's first cabinet reshuffle on 28 June 2007, Smith expressed interest in becoming Secretary of State for Education, but was appointed Home Secretary. She became the first woman to hold the position and the third woman to hold one of the Great Offices of State, after Margaret Thatcher (Prime Minister) and Margaret Beckett (Foreign Secretary). Just one day into her new job bombs were found in London, and a terrorist attack took place in Glasgow the following day.

On 24 January 2008, she announced new powers for the police, including the proposal to permit law enforcement services to hold terrorist suspects or those linked to terrorism for up to 42 days without charging them. In the same month Smith said that she would not feel safe on the streets of London at night. Critics suggested her statements were an admission that the government had failed to tackle crime effectively. Smith also introduced legislation to toughen the prostitution laws of England and Wales, making it a criminal offence to pay for sex with a prostitute controlled by a pimp, with the possibility that anyone caught paying for sex with an illegally trafficked woman could face criminal charges.

Smith introduced a crime-mapping scheme to allow citizens of England and Wales to access local crime information and how to combat crime. As Home Secretary, she was able to announce that minor crime dropped year-on-year under the Labour government, and continued to do so in 2008.

Smith managed to pass the 42-day detention law plans in the House of Commons, despite heavy opposition. The House of Lords voted overwhelmingly against the law, with some of the Lords reportedly characterising it as "fatally flawed, ill-thought-through and unnecessary", stating that "it seeks to further erode fundamental legal and civil rights". In March 2009, Smith published the first ever public Counter Terror Strategy.

When Conservative MP Damian Green was arrested in his Commons office, Smith stated that she was not informed of the impending arrest. The Metropolitan Police said that Green was "arrested on suspicion of conspiring to commit misconduct in a public office and aiding and abetting, counselling or procuring misconduct in a public office". A junior Home Office official, Christopher Galley, was later arrested regarding the same alleged offences as Green, and was released on bail. He was not charged, but he was suspended from his Home Office job while the investigation continued. He was later dismissed from his position for gross misconduct. Green did not dispute having dealings with the Home Office official.

In March 2009, at the height of the expenses furore, a leaked poll of Labour Party members revealed that Smith was considered to be the worst performing member of the Cabinet, with only 56% of her party believing she was doing a good job.

==== National identity legislation ====
In May 2009, Smith announced that the cost of introducing the National Identity Card project had risen to an estimated £5.3 billion, and that it would first become compulsory for foreign students and airport staff. It was planned that the cards would be made available from high-street shops at an estimated cost of £60. Smith defended her decision to use high-street shops, and stated that the hope was to make enrolment in the scheme a less intimidating experience and to make the cards easier to access. She claimed, despite evidence to the contrary, that the majority of the population was in favour of the scheme. In another privacy-related issue, Smith said she was disappointed at the European Court of Human Rights' decision to strike down a law allowing the government to store the DNA and fingerprints of people with no criminal record; in December 2008 an estimated 850,000 such DNA samples were being held in England and Wales. Her compromise was to scale down the length of time that data could be kept, with a maximum limit of 12 years. This went against the spirit of the Court's decision.

==== Drug policy ====
On 19 July 2007, Smith admitted to smoking cannabis a few times in Oxford in the 1980s. "I did break the law... I was wrong... drugs are wrong", she said. Asked why students today should listen when she urged them not to try the drug, she said that the dangers of cannabis use had become clearer, including mental health issues and the increasing strength of the drug over the past 25 years. Smith's admission was made public the day after Gordon Brown appointed her head of a new government review of UK drugs strategy.

In May 2008, against the recommendations of her own scientific advisers, Smith reversed the government's 2004 decision to downgrade cannabis to a class C drug, returning it to the status of class B, with the law change taking effect on 26 January 2009. According to her most senior expert drugs adviser Professor David Nutt, the following exchange took place between Smith and himself:

Smith: "You cannot compare the harms of an illegal activity with a legal one."

Nutt then asked whether one shouldn't compare the harms to see if something should be illegal.

Smith (after a long pause): "You can't compare the harms of an illegal activity with a legal one."

In February 2009, Smith was accused by Nutt of making a political decision in rejecting the scientific advice to downgrade ecstasy from a class A drug. The Advisory Council on the Misuse of Drugs (ACMD) report on ecstasy, based on a 12-month study of 4,000 academic papers, concluded that it is nowhere near as dangerous as other class A drugs such as heroin and crack cocaine, and should be downgraded to class B alongside amphetamines and cannabis. The advice was not followed; the government saying that it was "not prepared to send a message to young people that we take ecstasy less seriously". Smith was also widely criticised by the scientific community for bullying Professor Nutt into apologising for his factual comments that, in the course of a normal year, more people died from falling off horses than died from taking ecstasy.

==== Exclusion list ====
On 5 May 2009, Smith named 16 "undesirable individuals", including convicted murderers and advocates of violence, who were to be banned from entering the United Kingdom over their alleged threat to public order. Controversially, the exclusion list included outspoken American talk radio host Michael Savage, who instructed London lawyers to sue Smith for "serious and damaging defamatory allegations".

A Home Office spokeswoman said: "The home secretary has made it clear that if such a case was brought that any legal proceedings would be robustly defended." Smith defended the choice of individuals by declaring, "If you can't live by the rules that we live by, the standards and the values that we live by, we should exclude you from this country and, what's more, now we will make public those people that we have excluded." The Guardian criticised Smith's actions.

==== Expenses controversies and resignation ====
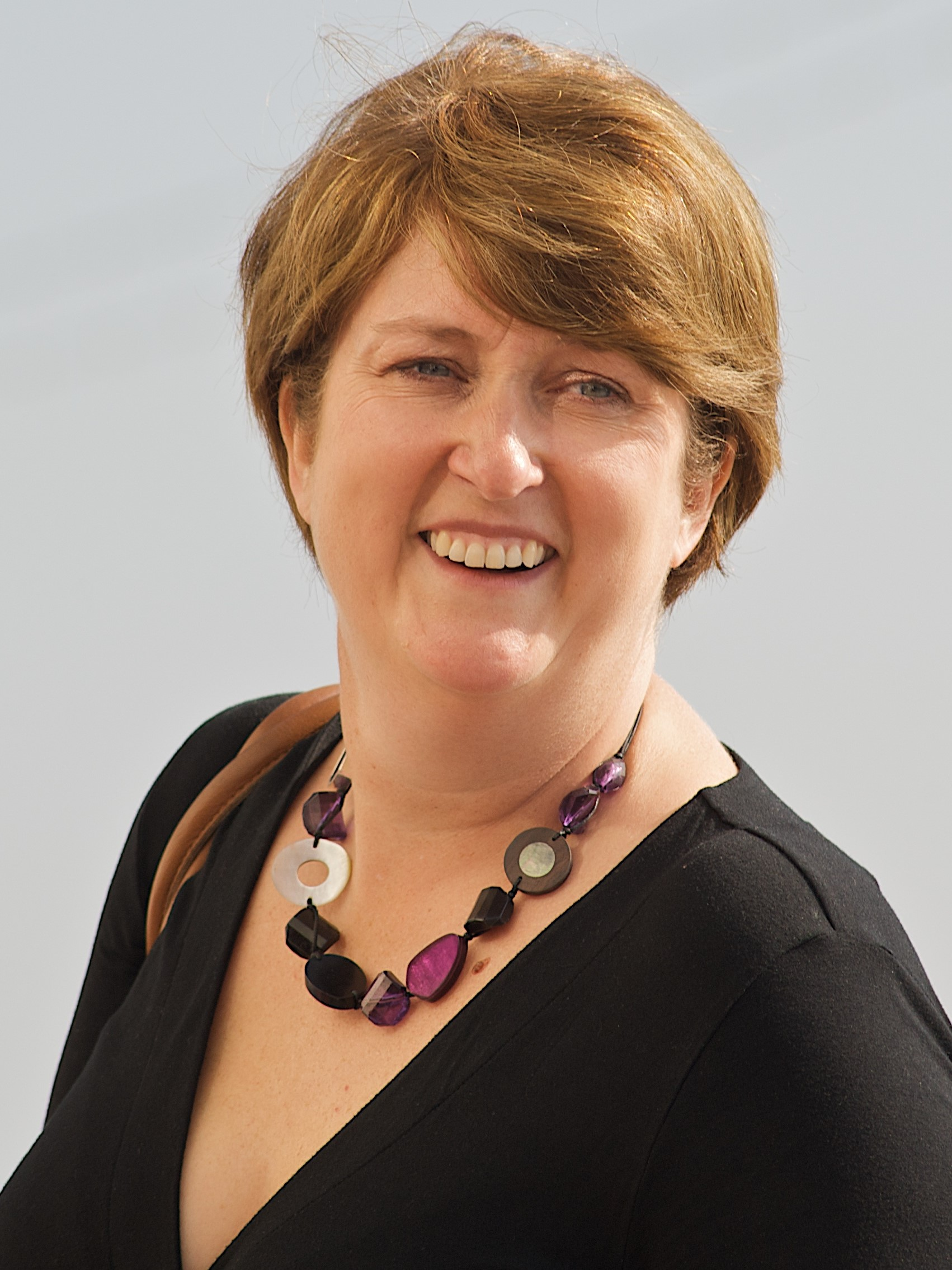
Smith in 2009

Smith was investigated by the Parliamentary Commissioner for Standards over accusations that she had inappropriately designated her sister's home in London as her main residence. The arrangement had allowed Smith to claim over £116,000 on her family's Redditch home since becoming an MP. Smith said that she had followed advice from parliamentary authorities.

On 8 February 2009, it was reported in the media that Smith had designated a house in London owned by her sister as her main residence in order to claim a parliamentary allowance for her house in Redditch as a secondary home, despite explicitly stating on her website that she "lives in Redditch". When asked whether it was fair that she made claims believed to have been made for items such as a flat-screen TV and scatter cushions, she said that analyses of her receipts had been very particular. In response to criticisms over her housing allowances, she said it was the "nature of the job" that MPs had to furnish and run two properties.

It was also reported that Smith had claimed expenses for a telecoms bill that contained two pornographic films and two other pay-per-view films. Smith said it was a mistake, and she would repay the amount. The reports made clear that the films had been viewed in the family home at a time when Smith was not present, and that she had given her husband, Richard Timney, a "real ear-bashing" over the incident. This, along with other cases, prompted calls for reform of the additional costs allowance and for a new system of payments to be introduced. Gordon Brown supported her and said she had done nothing wrong. However, Sir Alistair Graham, the former chairman of the Committee on Standards in Public Life, was critical of her actions, stating that naming her sister's spare bedroom as her main home was "near fraudulent". Smith was one of the highest-profile politicians involved in the expenses scandal; and, citing the impact on her family life, she later resigned.

In October 2009, it was reported that the Standards Commissioner, John Lyon, had looked into complaints over her expense claims. He concluded that, although her London home was a genuine home and she had spent more nights there than in her Redditch home, her constituency home was in fact her main home, and that she was in breach of Commons rules, despite "significant mitigating circumstances". The claims for pay-per-view films were also found to be in breach. Ms Smith was not asked to repay any money, but was told to "apologise to the House by means of a personal statement." Smith reacted by saying that she was "disappointed that this process has not led to a fairer set of conclusions, based on objective and consistent application of the rules as they were at the time."

In an interview with Radio Times published in February 2011, Smith claimed that her expenses had been scrutinised because she was a woman, saying: "[I] know that it was my expenses people looked at first because I was a woman and should have been at home looking after my husband and children." Smith said that she had felt "frozen rather than angry" on learning that her husband had entered a parliamentary expenses claim for two pornographic films.

On 2 June 2009, Smith confirmed that she would leave the Cabinet in the next reshuffle, expected after the local and European elections. She left office on 5 June and returned to the backbenches. She was replaced by Alan Johnson. In a subsequent interview with Total Politics magazine regarding her time as Home Secretary, Smith described how she felt under-qualified for her ministerial roles, adding "when I became Home Secretary, I'd never run a major organisation. I hope I did a good job. But if I did, it was more by luck than by any kind of development of skills. I think we should have been better trained. I think there should have been more induction." Smith's major achievements as Home Secretary were introduction of tougher prostitution laws, a reduction in crime rates and promotion of Police Community Support Officers. Journalist Andrew Pierce echoed Smith's comments about her unsuitability for the position of Home Secretary, going further by stating: "Smith, beset by gaffes and errors, was hopelessly out of her depth in one of the most demanding jobs in politics".

=== Leaving Parliament ===
In the general election on 6 May 2010, Smith lost her seat as MP for Redditch to Karen Lumley of the Conservative Party, who won the seat with a majority of 5,821 votes. Smith said that she had been "immensely honoured" to serve Redditch. Smith wrote an open letter to the new Conservative home secretary Theresa May, advising her that the post was often seen as a "poisoned chalice".

== After politics (2010–2024) ==
In 2010, Smith began working as a consultant for KPMG and as an adviser to Sarina Russo Job Access. She applied to be vice-chairman of the BBC Trust. For BBC Radio 5 Live, she presented a documentary on pornography, titled Porn Again, which was broadcast on 3 March 2011. It was followed by a special edition of the Tony Livesey show, discussing pornography. Smith regularly appeared on This Week and Question Time, and was also a regular weekly commentator on Sky News's Press Preview. She also contributed to The Purple Book in 2011, putting forward new ideas on crime and policing.

On 24 August 2011, it emerged that Smith had arranged for two prisoners on day-release to paint a room in her house, when they were supposed to be undertaking work to benefit the community. The Ministry of Justice launched an internal investigation into the matter, and Smith made a donation to the charity overseeing the scheme. The episode was condemned by Matthew Elliot of the TaxPayers' Alliance, who stated: "It's a disgrace that a former home secretary has used prisoners as her personal handymen".

Smith previously co-hosted a weekly show on talk radio station LBC alongside former Conservative cabinet minister David Mellor – she took over from Ken Livingstone after he left to contest the London mayoral race of 2012. She became chair of University Hospitals Birmingham NHS Foundation Trust in December 2013, though in 2020 she stepped down from this role temporarily to perform in Strictly Come Dancing.

Smith publicly supported the campaign for the UK to remain in the European Union in the 2016 EU referendum, and continued to argue for a second referendum on the issue until the 2019 general election.

Between 2017 and 2024, Smith co-hosted a weekly political and current affairs podcast, titled For The Many, alongside LBC broadcaster Iain Dale. She has appeared on Good Morning Britain on ITV. She is also the chair of both the Jo Cox Foundation and the Sandwell Children's Trust.

In September 2020, it was announced that Smith would compete in the eighteenth series of Strictly Come Dancing. She was partnered with Anton Du Beke, and became the first celebrity to be voted off the show.

In 2021 she was appointed as chair of both Barts Health NHS Trust and Barking, Havering and Redbridge University Hospitals NHS Trust.

== Return to politics as a member of the House of Lords ==
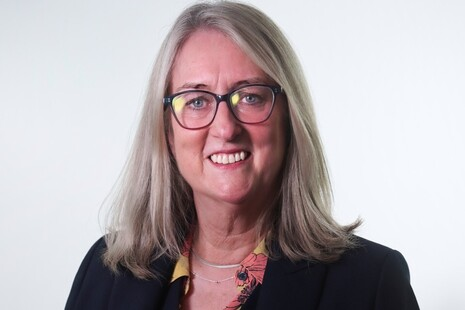
Smith as Minister of State at the Department for Education in 2024

Following Labour's victory in the 2024 general election, Prime Minister Keir Starmer appointed Smith Minister of State for Skills; a life peerage was conferred on her to allow her to hold the position. She was ennobled on 17 July 2024 with the title Baroness Smith of Malvern, of Malvern in the County of Worcestershire.

Smith was introduced to the House of Lords on 18 July 2024. She made her maiden speech in the Lords on 19 July during a debate on the King's Speech.

In July 2026, she was appointed to the new government as Minister of State in the Department for Work and Pensions and the Department for Education by Andy Burnham.

== Personal life ==
Smith married Richard Timney in October 1987; they have two sons. During her time as an MP, Smith employed her husband as her parliamentary aide on a salary of £40,000. In January 2020, she and Timney announced they had ended their marriage.

== Honours ==
- 2003: Appointed to the Privy Council, giving her the honorific title "The Right Honourable" for life.
- 2013: She was recognized as one of the BBC's 100 women.

Parliament of the United Kingdom
New constituency	Member of Parliament for Redditch; 1997–2010	Succeeded by Karen Lumley
Political offices
Preceded by Charles Clarke	Parliamentary Under-Secretary of State for Education and Employment; 1999–2001	Succeeded by John Healey as Parliamentary Under-Secretary of State for Education and Skills
Preceded by John Denham	Minister of State for Health Services; 2001–2003	Succeeded by Rosie Winterton
Preceded by Brian Wilson	Minister of State for Industry and the Regions; 2003–2005	Succeeded by Alun Michael
Preceded by Barbara Roche	Deputy Minister for Women; 2003–2005	Succeeded by Meg Munn
Preceded by Stephen Twigg as Minister of State for Schools	Minister of State for Schools and Learners; 2005–2006	Succeeded by Jim Knight
Preceded by Hilary Armstrong	Government Chief Whip in the House of Commons; 2006–2007	Succeeded by Geoff Hoon
Preceded by Hilary Armstrong	Parliamentary Secretary to the Treasury; 2006–2007	Succeeded by Geoff Hoon
Preceded by John Reid	Home Secretary; 2007–2009	Succeeded by Alan Johnson
Party political offices
Preceded by Hilary Armstrong	Labour Chief Whip in the House of Commons; 2006–2007	Succeeded by Geoff Hoon
