= Chris Bloore =

British politician

Chris Bloore MP
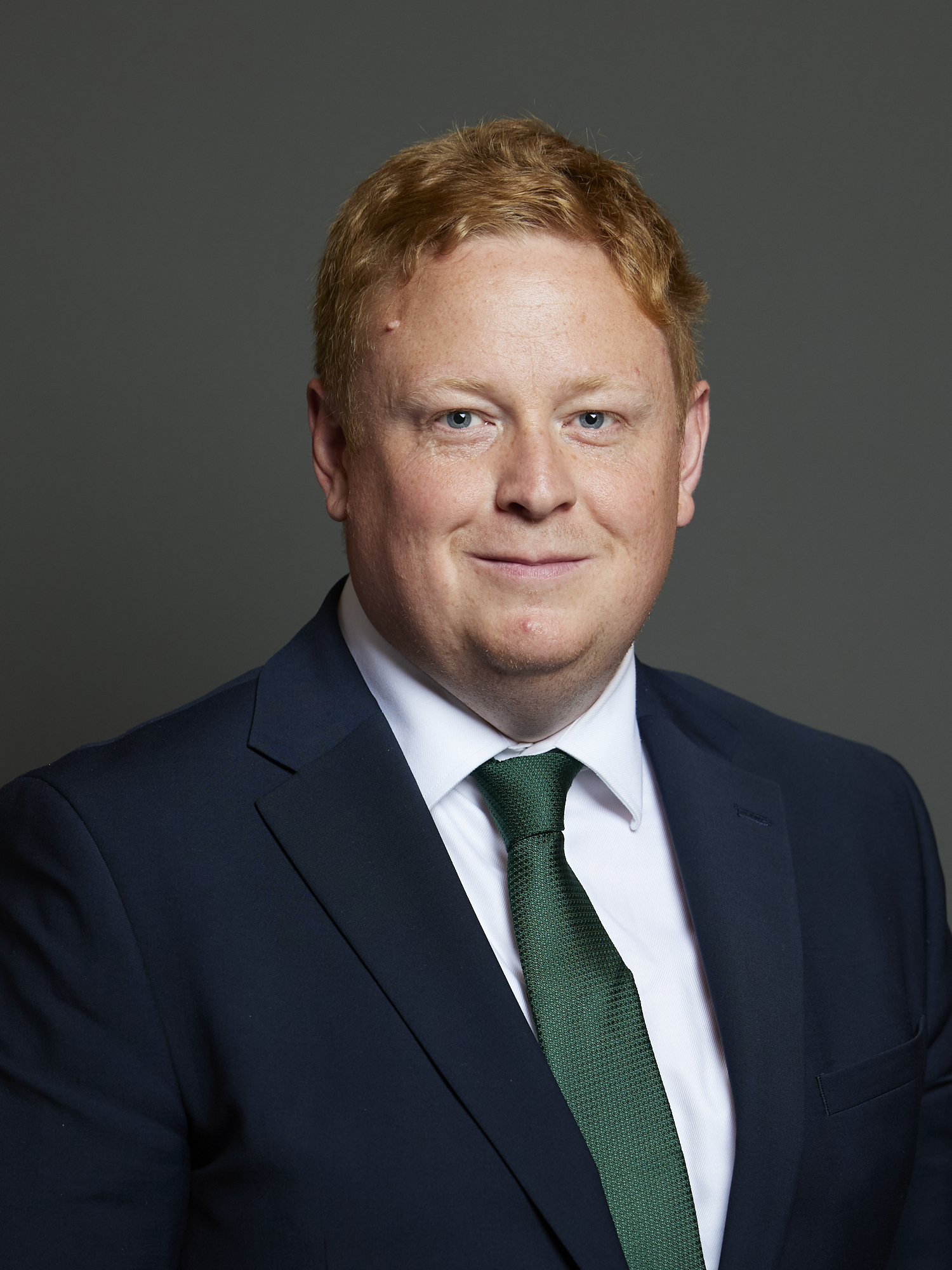
- Official portrait, 2024

Member of Parliament for Redditch
- Incumbent
- Assumed office 4 July 2024
- Preceded by: Rachel Maclean
- Majority: 789 (0.8%)

Personal details
- Party: Labour

Christopher James Bloore is a British Labour Party politician who has been the Member of Parliament for Redditch since 4 July 2024.

== Political career ==
Bloore was previously a member of Worcestershire County Council, representing Bromsgrove South; he resigned midway through his term after his election in 2017 to work in Toronto, Canada; his resignation triggered a by-election which was won by the Conservative Party, with Labour finishing fourth. Bloore was selected as the parliamentary candidate for Redditch in February 2024.

Bloore's local party website describes him as a "business leader". The Redditch Advertiser notes that he previously worked in Canada as the chief executive officer of a provincial tourism trade association.

Since entering Parliament, Bloore has raised the issue of children’s mental health and in March 2025 led a backbench business debate on mental health support in educational settings. He has also called for mental health support teams to be rolled out as quickly as possible across the country.

He has recognised the ‘institutional and strategic failures’ in SEND provision in Worcestershire and has called on the county council and central government to overhaul the system.

Bloore has praised his local football team, Redditch United F.C. in parliament for their work in the community, and their partnership with the local gambling charity Gordon Moody.

Bloore was one of 47 Labour MPs to vote against the Universal Credit and Personal Independence Payment Bill at its Third Reading, stating “in my own family, I have seen the devastating impact of these cruel diseases (Parkinson's and MS). That is why I sponsored an amendment aimed at enshrining support for those with fluctuating conditions. I voted for amendments that sought to address these concerns. Sadly, they were defeated and not added to the bill, and so I felt I could not support the legislation as it stood.”

Since 2024, he has been a member of the Northern Ireland Select Committee and sits on the executive of the trade union group of Labour MPs.

== Personal life ==
Bloore lives in Bromsgrove, Worcestershire.

Parliament of the United Kingdom
Preceded by Rachel Maclean	Member of Parliament for Redditch; 2024–present	Incumbent
