= Redditch (constituency) =

UK Parliament constituency (since 1997)

Coordinates: 52.24°N 1.98°W

- County constituency for the House of Commons
- Boundaries since 2024
- Boundary of Redditch in West Midlands region
- County: Worcestershire
- Electorate: 69,921 (2023)

Current constituency
- Created: 1997
- Member of Parliament: Chris Bloore (Labour)
- Seats: One
- Created from: Mid Worcestershire (part)

Redditch is a constituency in Worcestershire, England, represented in the House of Commons of the UK Parliament since 2024 by Chris Bloore of the Labour Party.

== Constituency profile ==
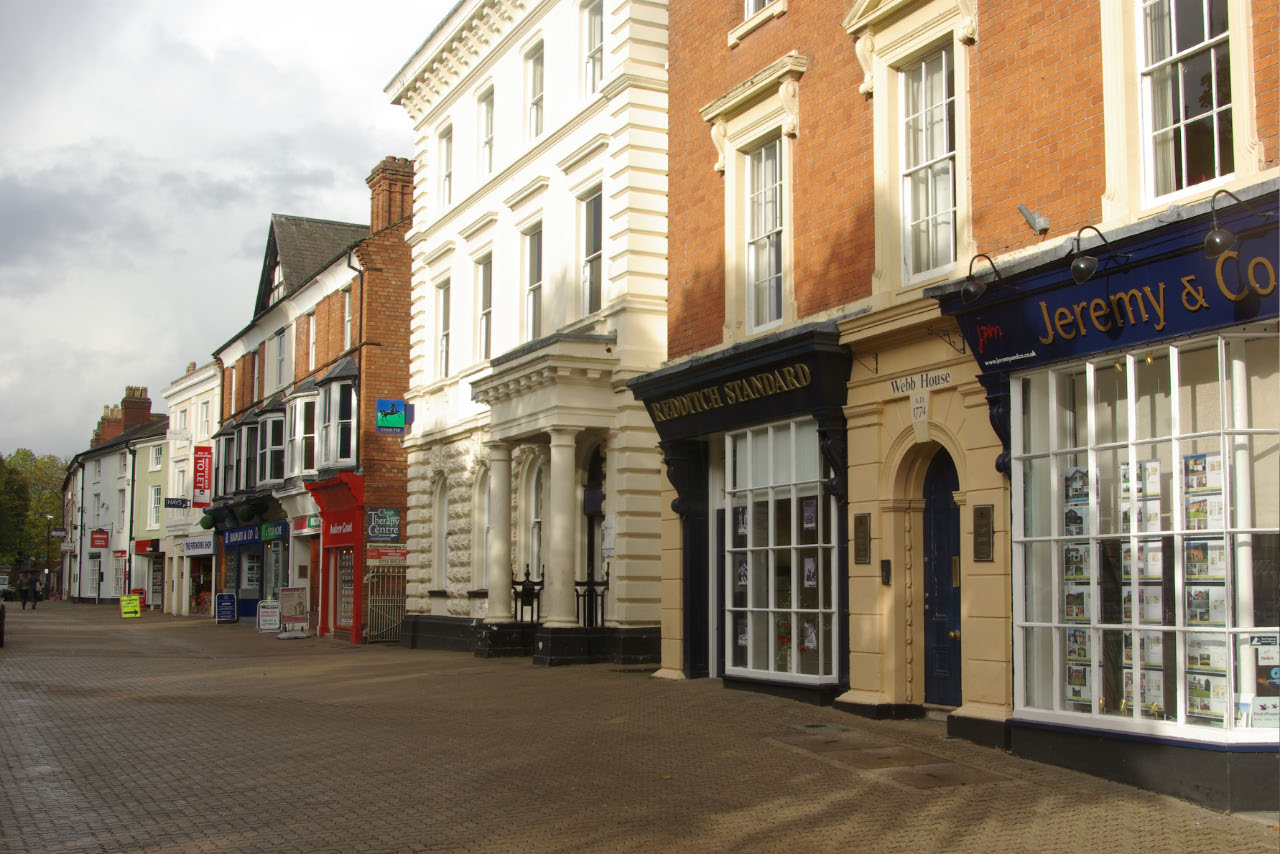
Church Green East, Redditch

Redditch is a constituency in Worcestershire in the West Midlands region of England. It covers the town and borough of Redditch, which has a population of around 88,000, and a rural area within the district of Wychavon to the west and south of the town, including the villages of Harvington and Wychbold.

Redditch is a large town located around 12 miles (19 km) south of Birmingham. It was traditionally a centre for the manufacture of needles and fishhooks; in the late 19th century, the town produced 90% of the world's needles. Redditch was designated a new town in 1964 to accommodate overspill from Birmingham, leading to rapid suburban development; the town's population more than doubled over the next twenty years. Redditch has overall average levels of wealth; the town has a mixture of housing types with some deprived and some affluent suburbs. House prices are generally higher than the rest of the West Midlands but lower than the UK average.

Residents of Redditch have a similar age profile to the rest of the country. They have average levels of income, homeownership and child poverty. Residents generally have below-average levels of education and a high proportion work in the retail and manufacturing sectors. The percentage claiming unemployment benefits is in line with the UK-wide rate. White people made up 91% of the population at the 2021 census.

Most of the town is represented by the Labour Party at the district council level, with some Conservatives elected in the rural areas and Reform UK councillors elected at the most recent election. At the county council, which held elections in 2025, all seats in the town were won by Reform UK. Voters in Redditch strongly supported leaving the European Union in the 2016 referendum; an estimated 62% voted in favour of Brexit compared to the UK-wide rate of 52%.

== Boundaries ==
This seat is located in Worcestershire and contains the whole borough of Redditch and parts of the district of Wychavon.

1997–2024: The Borough of Redditch and the District of Wychavon ward of Inkberrow.

To make the size of the constituency's electorate suitable, the nearby villages of Inkberrow, Callow Hill, Cookhill, Feckenham, and Astwood Bank were included upon the constituency's creation in 1997. For the 2010 general election the seat was expanded slightly in line with the revised boundaries of the Inkberrow ward. The villages of Hanbury and the Lenches were included, and the constituency reclassified from Borough to County.

2024–present: Under the 2023 review of Westminster constituencies which came into effect for the 2024 general election, the constituency is composed of the following as they existed on 1 December 2020:

- The Borough of Redditch; and
- The District of Wychavon wards of: Dodderhill; Harvington and Norton; Inkberrow.

In addition to the Wychavon Borough ward of Inkberrow, which was already part of the seat, the two wards of Dodderhill to the north, and Harvington and Norton to the south, were transferred from Mid Worcestershire (renamed Droitwich and Evesham).

== History ==
For the 1997 general election, the Boundary Commission recommended the creation of a separate constituency for the town of Redditch. From 1983 to 1997, the borough had comprised the majority of the Mid Worcestershire constituency, which was consequently subject to major changes. Before 1983 Redditch had been included in the Bromsgrove and Redditch seat (Bromsgrove prior to 1955). The Mid Worcestershire seat was a much safer seat for the Conservatives since 1997 than beforehand, due to the Labour-voting wards within Redditch being taken out and made into its own constituency as it is today. There are nonetheless some Conservative-voting wards in the town, and the rural areas of the constituency are also strongly Conservative.

Since its creation in 1997, Redditch has been a bellwether seat, electing MPs from the party that formed the government at each general election. Its first MP was Labour's Jacqui Smith who served as Home Secretary under Gordon Brown from 2007 to 2009 and was the first woman to hold the position. She resigned as Home Secretary in June 2009 following her involvement in the parliamentary expenses scandal and went on to lose the seat to Karen Lumley at the 2010 general election. Lumley was succeeded by fellow Conservative Rachel Maclean in 2017; who then lost the seat in 2024 to Chris Bloore of the Labour Party, with a slim majority of 1.8%.

== Members of Parliament ==
Election	Member	Party
1997	Jacqui Smith	Labour
2010	Karen Lumley	Conservative
2017	Rachel Maclean	Conservative
2024	Chris Bloore	Labour

== Elections ==
=== Elections in the 2020s ===
General election 2024: Redditch
Party	Candidate	Votes	%	±%
Labour	Chris Bloore	14,810	34.9	+9.0
Conservative	Rachel Maclean	14,021	33.1	−31.6
Reform	Julie Allison	8,516	20.1	N/A
Liberal Democrats	Andrew Fieldsend-Roxborough	2,165	5.1	−1.3
Green	David Thain	2,098	5.0	+2.0
Workers Party	Mohammed Amin	765	1.8	N/A
Majority		789	1.8	N/A
Turnout		42,375	59.7	−7.7
Registered electors		71,038		
Labour gain from Conservative		Swing	+20.4	

=== Elections in the 2010s ===
General election 2019: Redditch
Party	Candidate	Votes	%	±%
Conservative	Rachel Maclean	27,907	63.3	+11.0
Labour	Rebecca Jenkins	11,871	26.9	−9.1
Liberal Democrats	Bruce Horton	2,905	6.6	+4.0
Green	Claire Davies	1,384	3.1	+2.3
Majority		16,036	36.4	+20.1
Turnout		44,067	67.4	−2.9
Registered electors		65,391		
Conservative hold		Swing	+10.0	

General election 2017: Redditch
Party	Candidate	Votes	%	±%
Conservative	Rachel Maclean	23,652	52.3	+5.2
Labour	Rebecca Blake	16,289	36.0	+4.9
NHA	Neal Stote	2,239	5.0	New
UKIP	Paul Swansborough	1,371	3.0	−13.2
Liberal Democrats	Susan Juned	1,173	2.6	−0.5
Green	Kevin White	380	0.8	−1.4
Independent	Sally Woodhall	99	0.2	New
Majority		7,363	16.3	+0.3
Turnout		45,213	70.3	+2.8
Registered electors				
Conservative hold		Swing	+0.15	

General election 2015: Redditch
Party	Candidate	Votes	%	±%
Conservative	Karen Lumley	20,771	47.1	+3.6
Labour	Rebecca Blake	13,717	31.1	+0.8
UKIP	Peter Jewell	7,133	16.2	+12.8
Liberal Democrats	Hilary Myers	1,349	3.1	−14.5
Green	Kevin White	960	2.2	+1.3
Independent	Seth Colton	168	0.4	New
Majority		7,054	16.0	+2.8
Turnout		44,222	67.5	+3.3
Conservative hold		Swing	+1.4	

General election 2010: Redditch
Party	Candidate	Votes	%	±%
Conservative	Karen Lumley	19,138	43.5	+5.0
Labour	Jacqui Smith	13,317	30.3	−13.4
Liberal Democrats	Nicholas Lane	7,750	17.6	+3.2
UKIP	Anne Davis	1,497	3.4	0.0
BNP	Andy Ingram	1,394	3.2	New
Green	Kevin White	393	0.9	New
English Democrat	Vincent Schittone	255	0.6	New
Christian	Scott Beverley	101	0.2	New
Independent	Paul Swansborough	100	0.2	New
Independent	Derek Fletcher	73	0.2	New
Majority		5,821	13.2	N/A
Turnout		44,018	64.2	+1.4
Conservative gain from Labour		Swing	+9.2	

=== Elections in the 2000s ===
General election 2005: Redditch
Party	Candidate	Votes	%	±%
Labour	Jacqui Smith	18,012	44.7	−0.9
Conservative	Karen Lumley	15,296	38.0	−0.9
Liberal Democrats	Nigel Hicks	5,602	13.9	+3.6
UKIP	John Paul Ison	1,381	3.4	0.0
Majority		2,716	6.7	0.0
Turnout		40,291	62.8	+3.6
Labour hold		Swing	0.0	

General election 2001: Redditch
Party	Candidate	Votes	%	±%
Labour	Jacqui Smith	16,899	45.6	−4.2
Conservative	Karen Lumley	14,415	38.9	+2.8
Liberal Democrats	Michael Ashall	3,808	10.3	−0.7
UKIP	George Flynn	1,259	3.4	New
Green	Richard Armstrong	651	1.8	New
Majority		2,484	6.7	−7.0
Turnout		37,032	59.2	−14.3
Labour hold		Swing	-3.5	

=== Elections in the 1990s ===
General election 1997: Redditch
Party	Candidate	Votes	%	±%
Labour	Jacqui Smith	22,280	49.8	
Conservative	Anthea McIntyre	16,155	36.1	
Liberal Democrats	Malcolm Hall	4,935	11.0	
Referendum	Richard Cox	1,151	3.4	
Natural Law	Paul Davis	227	0.5	
Majority		6,125	13.7	
Turnout		44,748	73.5	
Labour gain from Conservative		Swing	▲10.2	

== See also ==
- parliamentary constituencies in Herefordshire and Worcestershire
- List of parliamentary constituencies in West Midlands (region)
