= Feckenham =

Village in Worcestershire, England

Coordinates: 52.250033°N 1.989251°W

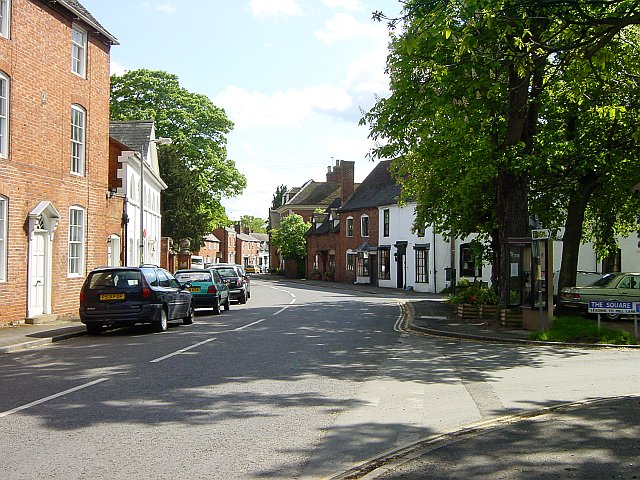

- Location within Worcestershire
- Population: 670
- Civil parish: Feckenham
- District: Redditch
- Shire county: Worcestershire
- Region: West Midlands
- Country: England
- Sovereign state: United Kingdom
- Post town: Redditch
- Postcode district: B96

Feckenham is a village and civil parish in the Redditch district in Worcestershire, England. It lies some 4 miles (6 km) south-west of the town of Redditch and some 11 miles (18 km) east of the city of Worcester. It had a population of 670 in the 2001 census and its immediate area is the location of notable royal manors that cover over 1,000 years of English history documented in many royal charters and Acts of Parliament. At its greatest, the historic Forest of Feckenham stretched to the River Avon in the south and to Worcester in the west. In 1389 Geoffrey Chaucer was as Clerk of Works and Keeper of the Lodge.

Feckenham in the 21st century is a rural community with a traditional English village green with walking and riding routes, including the long-distance public footpath, The Monarch's Way, that passes about 1.5 miles east of the village.

== History ==
=== Name ===
The name Feckenham derives from the Old English Feccahām meaning 'Fecca's village', or Feccahamm meaning 'Fecca's hemmed-in land'.

The village name has been recorded as Feccanhom (9th century), Feccheham (11th century), Fekkeham, Fekeham (12th century), Feckeham, Feckaham, Fecham (13th century), Flechenham (16th century), and Feckyngham in the 16th and 17th centuries.

=== Early and Medieval ===
In Roman times the village developed from its position on the ancient saltway track between Alcester and Droitwich which later became a Roman road (now the modern B4090 road) and on the early stretches of the Bow Brook. In the year 840, Feckenham Manor was given by Ethelric to Wœrferth, and it is mentioned in the 11th century Domesday Survey as being in the Hundred of Esch. The manors of Feckenham and Holloway in Hanbury were surveyed in 1086 under Herefordshire, because they had belonged to the Earl of Hereford, and though they remained in the hundred of Esch in Worcestershire, the Earl had so far annexed them to his lordship of Hereford that they were surveyed under that county.

Changes in land ownership led to the inclusion of Feckenham parish in the hundred of Halfshire in the 13th century.

The village once stood in the middle of the ancient Royal Forest of Feckenham. The area was a substantial forest covering much of Worcestershire, and was used by Norman royalty for hunting. In the Middle Ages, Feckenham was the administrative centre for the royal forest, and it grew into a thriving town while today's nearby large town of Redditch was still a small village. The forest court and prison building was located near the centre of the village, in an area now used as a sports ground.

The village was visited by all the early kings of England, who had a lodge in the park of Feckenham Manor. Several entries in Pipe Rolls and Patent Rolls between the years 1166 and 1169 relate to the repair of the king's houses in the manor, and there was a royal hunting lodge near the village. The remains of one ancient hunting lodge are believed to lie beneath the village recreation ground.

=== 17th century ===
In 1629, after a survey of the royal forests, Feckenham was disafforested in order for the Crown's lands to be cleared, and placed in the possession of rich courtiers close to Charles I. Rights of common that had been established by tradition were abolished, causing considerable riots, in which several miles of enclosure fences were broken up in early 1631. The disturbances followed a pattern found in other Royal Forests across the West and Midlands.

Three hundred people rioted the following year and were met by the Sheriff, a Deputy Lieutenant and a Justice of the Peace with forty armed men. The rioters "in a most daring and presumptuous manner presented themselves unto us with warlike weapons (vizt) pikes, forrest bills, pitchforks, swords and the like". On this occasion, the authorities acted to suppress this "flatt [flat] rebellion", tried to arrest the rioters and injured a number of them.

After disafforestation, the previous site of the court and prison building at Bennet's Bower was "planted with tobacco which grew very well, till the planting of it was prohibited by Act of Parliament".

Edward Leighton was a major beneficiary of the disafforestation, gaining around 360 acres of lands. The manor lands of Feckenham were sold by Leighton to Lord Coventry in 1632.

=== Recent ===
Under the Local Government Act 1894 the civil parish was formed out of the part of Feckenham parish that was in the former Redditch Urban District, and was divided into Feckenham Rural and Feckenham Urban Districts, and the communities of Headless Cross and Crabbs Cross became part of Redditch Urban District.

== Economy ==
From around 1790 and during the Industrial Revolution, the parish and Redditch were well known for the manufacture of needles and fish-hooks. Cycles and motors have also been manufactured in the area. Agriculture is still a major activity. Feckenham was the corporate headquarters of Barretts of Feckenham, a former nationwide chain of camping and walking equipment stores that ceased trading in 2008. A new chain of stores specialising in camping and outdoor equipment, Winfield's, took over much of the Barrett business and operates from the former premises in Feckenham. Several bed & breakfast guest houses and two pubs represent the village's hospitality industry. There is a garage carrying out motor maintenance and repairs.

=== Electrical substation ===
The 275 kV substation was built from 1960-61. A 125-ton transformer was transported from AEI in Rugby in early October 1960. This was thought to be the largest load on the M1 at the time, a distance of 94 miles. It was one of two transformers. It opened in 1961, one of two Supergrid stations in the country.

== Architecture ==
There are two churches in the village. The Anglican church of St. John the Baptist was built in the mid 13th century and has a peal of eight bells; the Roman Catholic church is dedicated to St. John Fisher and St. Thomas More.

The former site of the forest court and jail (Bennet's Bower) is now a sports field, west of the Anglican church.

The village also contains several examples of black and white half-timbered work, especially Middle Bean Hall. One of the most notable is the 16th-century Shurnock Court Farm, situated about 2 kilometres (1 mi) east of the village. The largest house in the neighbourhood is Norgrove Court, a large red brick two-storey mansion built in the mid 17th century. The massive oak door of a building that housed a former grammar school is recorded on a plaque on the south wall as: 'Erected A.D. 1611. Repaired A.D. 1848.' The village also contains well-preserved examples of Georgian architecture.

== Activities and attractions ==
A range of community activities includes an annual two-day horse show, and a tri-annual Feckenham Flower and Garden Festival that has been held since 1985. There is an annual Summer Fair (called the Wake) and Spring and Autumn Flower Shows were held from the mid 1930s until 2023.

A major refurbishment of the village hall was undertaken in 2003 with grants from the National Lottery and other donations. It is the location of the FeckenOdeon Cinema and many other social and community activities including the village Nursery School.

Feckenham's Wylde Moor nature reserve is an area of wetland managed by the Worcestershire Wildlife Trust and has two bird-watching hides. Local walkways and sections of countryside have been used as locations for films. It is one of three fen wetlands in Worcestershire. The peat is in places 4 metres deep. Within the reserve are 4 meadows, all of which are floristically rich. The southern meadow unusually contains sea club rush due to the saline ground water found in the area.

The village has a family owned pub, a gastro-pub and a community village shop, "The Village Shop", opened in 2009 and run by the local community.

Feckenham Cricket Club was founded in 1959 and its ground at the foot of Mill Lane is one of the most picturesque in the county. Its teams play in the Worcester County League and there is a thriving junior section, accompanied by the ECB-sponsored All Stars program for children of 5–8. In addition to the cricket activities, the club is supported by a fine bar with real ales and ciders, open Wed-Sun during the season, Thu-Sun outside. New members welcome.

Feckenham Football Club, affectionately nicknamed 'The Millers', was formed in 1881 by local villagers and played for nearly a century at Mill Lane – the recreational ground known by locals as 'The Playing Fields'. The team moved in 1998 when it had to relocate as the ground could not be brought up to the standard required to play in the Midland Combination Premier Division. Despite the club having moved, the clubhouse is still intact and the pitch maintained, with youngsters enjoying the chance formally to train over summers with the club or informally kick about. Maisie Baker, a former Aston Villa ladies' and England U19 footballer currently on scholarship at the University of Miami, hails from Feckenham and cites utilising this area as an important part of her own football development.

It also has its own Facebook page – Spotted Feckenham.

The Feckenham Forest History Society, founded in 1990, holds meetings and publishes a magazine, the Feckenham Forester, about the local history of Feckenham and the surrounding area.

The village publishes a monthly magazine Feckenham News and in 2016 a community internet based radio station "Swansbrook Radio" began broadcasting.

== Education ==
Feckenham has a Church of England first school (primary school).

== Sport ==
The village of Feckenham has a cricket ground and a recreation ground (which serves mainly as a football pitch). The latter is affectionately known by locals as 'The Playing Fields'. In 2007, the final match of the five-match series of the India v England Blind Cricket tour was played at the Feckenham Cricket Club ground as the Worcester CC pitch had been flooded by the River Severn earlier that year.

== Transport ==
The A441 is one mile east of the village, and the M5 motorway is about 5 miles (8.0 km) west.

The nearest railway stations are Redditch and Evesham.

One bus route (354 – Droitwich to Redditch) serves the village with one service in either direction on Tuesdays and Thursdays only.

The National Cycle Network Route 5 can be reached around 2.5 miles (4.0 km) north of the village.

The nearest airport is Birmingham Airport.

== Notable people ==
- John Feckenham (c. 1515–1584), canonised English ecclesiastic and last abbot of Westminster, was born at Feckenham.
- Sir Thomas Cookes (1648–1701) of Norgrove Court. He settled an endowment on Worcester College, Oxford with a preference for students from Feckenham among others.
- Suzanne Virdee (b. 1969), is a News reader for BBC Midlands Today.
- Oobah Butler (b.1992), filmmaker, journalist, author and satirist.

== See also ==
- List of English and Welsh endowed schools (19th century)
