= Redditch Borough Council elections =

Local government elections in Worcestershire, England

Redditch Borough Council elections are held three years out of every four, with a third of the council elected each time. Redditch Borough Council is the local authority for the non-metropolitan district of Redditch in Worcestershire, England. Since the last boundary changes in 2024, 27 councillors are elected from 9 wards.

== Council elections ==
- 1973 Redditch District Council election
- 1976 Redditch District Council election
- 1979 Redditch District Council election
- 1983 Redditch Borough Council election (New ward boundaries)
- 1984 Redditch Borough Council election
- 1986 Redditch Borough Council election
- 1987 Redditch Borough Council election
- 1988 Redditch Borough Council election
- 1990 Redditch Borough Council election
- 1991 Redditch Borough Council election
- 1992 Redditch Borough Council election
- 1994 Redditch Borough Council election (Borough boundary changes took place but the number of seats remained the same)
- 1995 Redditch Borough Council election
- 1996 Redditch Borough Council election
- 1998 Redditch Borough Council election
- 1999 Redditch Borough Council election
- 2000 Redditch Borough Council election
- 2002 Redditch Borough Council election
- 2003 Redditch Borough Council election
- 2004 Redditch Borough Council election (New ward boundaries)
- 2006 Redditch Borough Council election
- 2007 Redditch Borough Council election
- 2008 Redditch Borough Council election
- 2010 Redditch Borough Council election
- 2011 Redditch Borough Council election
- 2012 Redditch Borough Council election
- 2014 Redditch Borough Council election
- 2015 Redditch Borough Council election
- 2016 Redditch Borough Council election
- 2018 Redditch Borough Council election
- 2019 Redditch Borough Council election
- 2021 Redditch Borough Council election
- 2022 Redditch Borough Council election
- 2023 Redditch Borough Council election
- 2024 Redditch Borough Council election (New ward boundaries)
- 2026 Redditch Borough Council election

== Results maps ==
2004 results map

2006 results map

2007 results map

2008 results map

2010 results map

2011 results map

2012 results map

2014 results map

2015 results map

2016 results map

2018 results map

2019 results map

2021 results map

2022 results map

2023 results map

2024 results map

2026 results map

== By-election results ==
=== 1994-1998 ===
West By-Election 13 March 1997
Party	Candidate	Votes	%	±%
Conservative	Karen Lumley	857	45.7	
Labour	Richard Timney	855	45.6	
Liberal Democrats	Kathleen Cummings	122	6.5	
Green	Dave Glover	40	2.0	
Majority		2	0.1	
Turnout		1,874	31.7	
Conservative gain from Labour		Swing		

Batchley By-Election 3 July 1997
Party	Candidate	Votes	%	±%
Labour	Jack Cookson	634	85.3	+2.3
Conservative	Juilet Brummer	86	11.6	+1.2
Green	Dave Glover	23	3.1	+3.1
Majority		548	73.7	
Turnout		743	14.6	
Labour hold		Swing		

Lodge Park By-Election 3 July 1997
Party	Candidate	Votes	%	±%
Labour	Andrew Fry	455	60.5	−1.6
Conservative	Kath Banks	219	29.1	+12.8
Liberal Democrats	Nigel Hicks	70	9.3	−1.2
Green	Richard Armstrong	8	1.0	+1.0
Majority		236	31.4	
Turnout		752	16.5	
Labour hold		Swing		

Greenlands By-Election 2 April 1998
Party	Candidate	Votes	%	±%
Labour	Helen Cartwright	586	53.9	−1.2
Conservative	David Chart	398	36.6	+6.5
Liberal Democrats	Antony Pitt	103	9.5	−5.3
Majority		188	17.3	
Turnout		1,087	16.9	
Labour hold		Swing		

=== 2002-2006 ===
Crabbs Cross & Rural By-Election 3 April 2003
Party	Candidate	Votes	%	±%
Conservative	Jack Field	843	55.7	+5.2
Labour	Richard Timney	532	35.2	−2.1
Liberal Democrats	Michael Ashall	138	9.1	−3.2
Majority		311	20.5	
Turnout		1,513	26.8	
Conservative hold		Swing		

=== 2006-2010 ===
Batchley By-Election 17 July 2008
Party	Candidate	Votes	%	±%
Conservative	Brenda Quinney	630	39.0	−12.4
Labour	Greg Chance	539	33.4	−4.3
BNP	Maurice Field	299	18.5	+18.5
Liberal Democrats	Russel Taylor	121	7.5	−3.4
Independent	Orion Moon	25	1.5	+1.5
Majority		91	5.6	
Turnout		1,614	27.6	
Conservative gain from Labour		Swing		

Central By-Election 26 March 2009
Party	Candidate	Votes	%	±%
Labour	Greg Chance	700	51.3	+15.2
Conservative	Terry Spencer	511	37.4	−9.6
Liberal Democrats	Anthony Pitt	84	6.2	−3.5
Green	Kevin White	36	2.6	+2.6
Independent	Richard Armstrong	34	2.5	−4.7
Majority		189	13.9	
Turnout		1,365	23.2	
Labour gain from Conservative		Swing		

Headless Cross and Oakenshaw By-Election 26 March 2009
Party	Candidate	Votes	%	±%
Conservative	Gay Hopkins	764	48.2	−14.7
Labour	Pattie Hill	502	31.7	+8.5
Liberal Democrats	John Stanley	162	10.2	−3.7
Green	Alistair Waugh	113	7.1	+7.1
Independent	Isabel Armstrong	45	2.8	+2.8
Majority		262	16.5	
Turnout		1,586	23.2	
Conservative hold		Swing		

=== 2014-2018 ===
Church Hill By-Election 14 July 2014
Party	Candidate	Votes	%	±%
Labour	Nina Wood-Ford	600	43.9	+11.7
Conservative	Kathy Haslam	339	24.8	+2.2
UKIP	Len Harris	332	24.3	−10.5
Liberal Democrats	David Gee	40	2.9	−1.2
Green	Lee Bradley	34	2.5	−1.7
Independent	Isabel Armstrong	13	1.0	+1.0
Independent	Agnieszka Wiecek	9	0.7	−0.7
Majority		261	19.1	
Turnout		1,367		
Labour gain from UKIP		Swing		

=== 2022-2026 ===
Headless Cross and Oakenshaw By-Election 1 September 2022
Party	Candidate	Votes	%	±%
Labour	Juliet Barker Smith	767	41.9	+17.7
Conservative	Helen Sanders	686	37.5	−25.4
Liberal Democrats	Andrew Fieldsend-Roxborough	274	15.0	+9.3
Green	Alistair Waugh	102	5.6	−1.6
Majority		81	4.4	
Turnout		1,833	28.2	
Labour gain from Conservative		Swing		
