= 2024 Redditch Borough Council election =

Local election in Redditch, England

← 2023	2 May 2024	2026 →

All 27 seats to Redditch Borough Council 14 seats needed for a majority

	First party	Second party
Leader	Joe Baker	Matthew Dormer
Party	Labour	Conservative
Seats before	12	16
Seats won	21	5
Seat change	▲9	▼11
Popular vote	24,751	19,125
Percentage	48.2%	37.2%
Swing	▲4.3%	▼1.7%
	Third party	Fourth party
Party	Green	Liberal Democrats
Seats before	0	1
Seats won	1	0
Seat change	▲1	▼1
Popular vote	4,460	2,698
Percentage	8.7%	5.2%
Swing	▲0.6%	▼1.9%
- Winner of each seat at the 2024 Redditch Borough Council election
Leader before election
Matthew Dormer
Conservative
Leader after election
Joe Barker
Labour

The 2024 Redditch Borough Council election took place on Thursday 2 May 2024, alongside the other local elections in the United Kingdom, which were held on the same day. All 27 seats on Redditch Borough Council in Worcestershire were up for election, following boundary changes. The Labour Party took control of the council.

== Background ==
Redditch was a traditionally Labour council. Labour controlled the council from 1976 until 2000, and again from 2004 to 2006. The Conservatives took control of the council from no overall control in 2010, but lost control to Labour in 2012.

The Conservatives had held a majority on the council since 2018. In the 2023 local elections, the Conservatives lost 5 seats with a vote share of 38.8%, and Labour gained 5 with 43.8%.

== Boundary changes ==
Redditch usually elects its councillors in thirds, on a 4-year cycle. However, following boundary changes, all councillors will be elected to the new wards. The change reduces the number of councillors by 2.

Old wards	No. of seats	New wards	No. of seats
Abbey	2	Astwood Bank and Feckenham	3
Astwood Bank and Feckenham	2	Batchley and Brockhill	3
Batchley (Note: Renamed Batchley and Brockhill in 2008.)	3	Central	3
Central	2	Greenlands and Lakeside	3
Church Hill	3	Headless Cross and Oakenshaw	3
Crabbs Cross	2	Matchborough and Woodrow	3
Greenlands	3	North	3
Headless Cross and Oakenshaw	3	Webheath and Callow Hill	3
Lodge Park	2	Winyates	3
Matchborough	2		
West	2		
Winyates	3		

== Previous council composition ==
After 2023 election		Before 2024 election		After 2024 election	
Party	Seats	Party	Seats	Party	Seats
Conservative	16	Conservative	16	Conservative	5
Labour	13	Labour	12	Labour	21
Green	0	Green	0	Green	1
Liberal Democrats	0	Liberal Democrats	1	Liberal Democrats	0

Changes:

- January 2024: Kerrie Miles joins Liberal Democrats from Labour

== Summary ==
=== Election result ===
2024 Redditch Borough Council election
Party	Candidates	Seats	Gains	Losses	Net gain/loss	Seats %	Votes %	Votes	+/−
Labour	27	21	7	0	▲9	77.8	48.2	24,751	+4.3
Conservative	27	5	0	6	▼11	18.5	37.2	19,125	–1.7
Green	11	1	0	0	▲1	3.7	8.7	4,460	+0.6
Liberal Democrats	15	0	0	1	▼1	0.0	5.2	2,698	–1.9
Independent	1	0	0	0	Steady	0.0	0.7	358	–1.3

Labour won a majority of the seats on the council at the election. Their group leader, Joe Baker, was formally appointed as leader of the council at the subsequent annual council meeting on 20 May 2024.

== Ward results ==
=== Astwood Bank & Feckenham ===
Astwood Bank & Feckenham Ward (3)
Party	Candidate	Votes	%	±%
Conservative	Craig Warhurst*	1,054	48.5	
Conservative	Brandon Clayton*	1,036	47.7	
Conservative	Christopher Holz*	900	41.5	
Labour	Gilly Cooper	896	41.3	
Labour	Matt Smith	776	35.7	
Labour	Colin Smith	724	33.3	
Green	Glen Theobald	277	12.8	
Liberal Democrats	David Gee	198	9.1	
Liberal Democrats	Malcolm Hall	174	8.0	
Turnout		2,186	31.7	
Registered electors		6,906		
Conservative hold				
Conservative hold				
Conservative win (new seat)				

=== Batchley & Brockhill ===
Batchley & Brockhill Ward (3)
Party	Candidate	Votes	%	±%
Labour	Joe Baker*	1,061	54.9	
Labour	Wanda King	905	46.8	
Labour	Sachin Mathur	893	46.2	
Conservative	Lucy Harrison*	643	33.2	
Conservative	Finlay Heath	543	28.1	
Conservative	Christopher Marshall	483	25.0	
Liberal Democrats	Kerrie Miles*	218	11.3	
Green	Lea Room	193	10.0	
Liberal Democrats	Martin Mcleod	178	9.2	
Liberal Democrats	Sara Allmark	165	8.5	
Turnout		1,945	26.9	
Registered electors		7,233		
Labour hold				
Labour gain from Conservative				
Labour gain from Liberal Democrats				

=== Central ===
Central Ward (3)
Party	Candidate	Votes	%	±%
Labour	Sharon Harvey*	1,032	60.5	
Labour	William Boyd	1,007	59.0	
Labour	Gary Slim	956	56.0	
Conservative	Ummar Memi	354	20.7	
Conservative	Sully Mohammed	344	20.2	
Conservative	Junior Qadeer	326	19.1	
Green	David Heaselgrave	279	16.3	
Liberal Democrats	Glenn Harris	215	12.6	
Liberal Democrats	Roy Magara	162	9.5	
Turnout		1,731	25.4	
Registered electors		6,811		
Labour hold				
Labour gain from Conservative				
Labour win (new seat)				

=== Greenlands & Lakeside ===
Greenlands & Lakeside Ward (3)
Party	Candidate	Votes	%	±%
Labour	Andrew Fry	1,177	59.1	
Labour	Joanna Kane*	1,078	54.1	
Labour	Juma Begum*	1,023	51.4	
Conservative	Susan Clarke	571	28.7	
Conservative	Timothy Pearman	550	27.6	
Conservative	Peter Fleming	517	26.0	
Green	Kevin White	275	13.8	
Liberal Democrats	Jade Taylor	201	10.1	
Turnout		1,992	26.2	
Registered electors		7,611		
Labour win (new seat)				
Labour win (new seat)				
Labour win (new seat)				

=== Headless Cross & Oakenshaw ===
Headless Cross & Oakenshaw Ward (3)
Party	Candidate	Votes	%	±%
Labour	Juliet Barker Smith	1,192	50.3	
Labour	Ian Woodall	1,088	45.9	
Labour	David Munro	1,070	45.1	
Conservative	Tom Baker-Price	921	38.8	
Conservative	Helen Sanders	788	33.2	
Conservative	Roger Bennett	785	33.1	
Green	Stuart Davies	290	12.2	
Liberal Democrats	Edward Killworth	159	6.7	
Liberal Democrats	Andrew Fieldsend-Roxborough	158	6.7	
Turnout		2,382	33.2	
Registered electors		7,165		
Labour hold				
Labour hold				
Labour gain from Conservative				

=== Matchborough & Woodrow ===
Matchborough & Woodrow Ward (3)
Party	Candidate	Votes	%	±%
Labour	Jane Spilsbury*	888	49.8	
Labour	James Fardoe	860	48.2	
Labour	Paul Wren	819	45.9	
Conservative	Emma Marshall	543	30.5	
Conservative	Theo Ellinas	537	30.1	
Conservative	Nathan Winter	423	23.7	
Independent	Juliet Brunner	358	20.1	
Green	Kath Manning	214	12.0	
Liberal Democrats	Diane Thomas	141	7.9	
Liberal Democrats	Andy Thompson	96	5.4	
Turnout		1,791	23.6	
Registered electors		7,586		
Labour win (new seat)				
Labour win (new seat)				
Labour win (new seat)				

=== North ===
North Ward (3)
Party	Candidate	Votes	%	±%
Labour	Bill Hartnett*	1,027	47.9	
Labour	Monica Stringfellow*	1,021	47.6	
Labour	Sid Khan*	929	43.3	
Conservative	Karen Ashley*	886	41.3	
Conservative	Mike Chalk	734	34.2	
Conservative	Kerry Simons	639	29.8	
Liberal Democrats	Mark Tomes	261	12.2	
Green	Jo Heaselgrave	204	9.5	
Turnout		2,161	30.5	
Registered electors		7,094		
Labour win (new seat)				
Labour win (new seat)				
Labour win (new seat)				

=== Webheath & Callow Hill ===
Webheath & Callow Hill Ward (3)
Party	Candidate	Votes	%	±%
Conservative	Matthew Dormer*	1,101	43.7	
Conservative	Gemma Monaco*	994	39.5	
Green	Claire Davies	948	37.7	
Conservative	Salman Akbar*	886	35.2	
Green	Margot Bish	859	34.1	
Green	Sharon Howard	603	24.0	
Labour	Hannah McGahan	541	21.5	
Labour	Monica Fry	482	19.1	
Labour	Mark Harvey	470	18.7	
Liberal Democrats	Ann Gee	125	5.0	
Turnout		2,533	35.5	
Registered electors		7,134		
Conservative win (new seat)				
Conservative win (new seat)				
Green win (new seat)				

=== Winyates ===
Winyates Ward (3)
Party	Candidate	Votes	%	±%
Labour	Rita Rogers	949	43.8	
Labour	Jen Snape	946	43.6	
Labour	Alan Mason	941	43.4	
Conservative	Luke Court*	890	41.0	
Conservative	Amanda Canning	880	40.6	
Conservative	Julian Grubb	797	36.7	
Green	Clare Beckhelling	318	14.7	
Liberal Democrats	John Marsh	247	11.4	
Turnout		2,183	32.1	
Registered electors		6,810		
Labour gain from Conservative				
Labour gain from Conservative				
Labour gain from Conservative				
