= Redditch Town Hall =

Municipal building in Redditch, Worcestershire, England

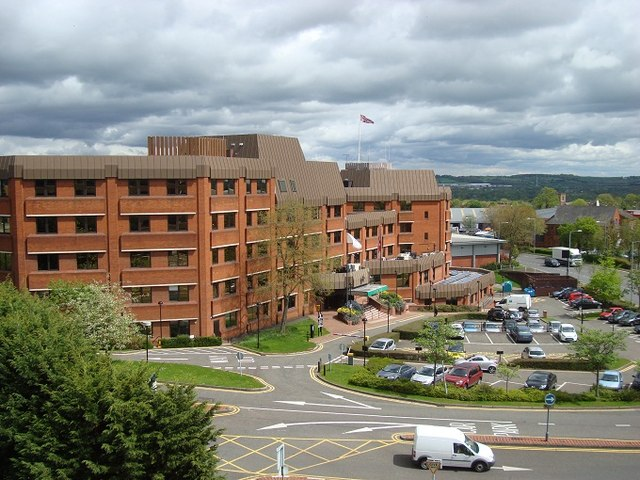
- The building in 2012

- Shown in Worcestershire
- 52.3051°N 1.9386°W
- Location: Walter Stranz Square, Redditch

History
- Built: 1982

Site notes
- Architect(s): Cassidy & Ashton Partners and Ove Arup & Partners
- Architectural style: Modern style

Redditch Town Hall is a municipal building in Walter Stranz Square in Redditch, a town in Worcestershire, in England. It is the headquarters of Redditch Borough Council.

== History ==
After significant population growth, largely associated with the needle and fishing tackle industries, a local board of health was formed in the area in 1858. After the local board of health was succeeded by Redditch Urban District Council in 1894, the new council adopted the old police station and magistrates' court in Evesham Street as its offices. The council later acquired a Victorian style house on the corner of Mount Pleasant and Salop Street: that building became known as The Council House although, after the council left, it was rebuilt and became known as Stoneleigh House.

The Council House in Mount Pleasant continued to serve as the headquarters of the urban district council for much of the 20th century and remained a meeting place for the enlarged Redditch Borough Council which was formed in 1974. However, in the late 1970s, with the increasing responsibilities of the borough council, council leaders decided to commission a more substantial civic complex. The site they selected, on the southwest side of Alcester Street, was occupied by town's fire station.

The new building was designed by Cassidy & Ashton Partners in partnership with Ove Arup & Partners, built in red brick with metal roofs and was completed in 1982. The design involved an asymmetrical main frontage erected around a courtyard facing onto Alcester Street which featured fountains and an octagonal kiosk with a pyramid-shaped roof. Internally, the principal room was the council chamber which was established in a single storey polygonal structure in the south east corner of the complex. The architectural historian, Nikolaus Pevsner, seemed unimpressed with some aspects of the design: he said that "the building outstays its welcome by extending…along the southwest of Alcester Street."

The town hall was the venue, in October 1984, for the annual Aneurin Bevan Memorial Lecture during which the Deputy Leader of the Labour Party, Roy Hattersley, spoke about reducing unemployment and repatriating capital back to the UK.

By 2020, much of the building's floorspace was disused, leading to calls for a major renovation project. Civic leaders announced that the building would be extended, with a new entrance and reception area added, and it was confirmed that the town library, jobcentre and Citizens' Advice Bureau would all relocate to the building. It was also decided that the west wing would be converted to accommodate a National Health Service clinic, while the council chamber would move to the second floor. The first stage of the works, relating to the new clinic, was completed in October 2023, while construction work to implement the second stage of project, relating to the relocation of the council chamber, commenced on site in April 2024. The project to demolish Redditch Library and relocate services to the town hall, which was led by the Conservative-led Redditch Borough Council and approved by Worcestershire County Council despite strong public opposition, was cancelled after Redditch Labour gained control of the council in the 2024 Redditch Borough Council election.
