= 1996 Redditch Borough Council election =

1996 UK local government election

Redditch Borough Council elections were held on Thursday 2 May 1996. Nine council wards were up for election.

== Ward results ==
Batchley
Party	Candidate	Votes	%	±%
Labour	Betty Passingham	1,017	83.0	
Conservative	R. Bailey	128	10.4	
Liberal Democrats	D. Pelling	81	6.6	
Majority		889	72.5	
Turnout		1,226	27.8	
Labour hold		Swing		

Central
Party	Candidate	Votes	%	±%
Labour	John Witherspoon	886	59.2	
Conservative	Freda Ludwig	347	23.2	
Independent Labour	G. Inniss	178	11.9	
Green	M. Wisniewski	86	5.7	
Majority		539	36.0	
Turnout		1,497	27.8	
Labour hold		Swing		

Church Hill
Party	Candidate	Votes	%	±%
Labour	William Hartnett	817	64.7	
Liberal Democrats	Diane Thomas	203	16.1	
Conservative	L. Greenway	201	15.9	
Green	Isabelle Armstrong	41	3.2	
Majority		614	48.7	
Turnout		1,262	24.4	
Labour hold		Swing		

Feckenham
Party	Candidate	Votes	%	±%
Labour	Graham Mutton	808	54.0	
Conservative	Keith Boyd-Carpenter	688	46.0	
Majority		120	8.0	
Turnout		1,496	32.4	
Labour gain from Conservative		Swing		

Greenlands
Party	Candidate	Votes	%	±%
Labour	Gail Stone	1,002	55.1	
Conservative	Gavin Smithers	548	30.1	
Liberal Democrats	Anthony Pitt	270	14.8	
Majority		454	25.0	
Turnout		1,820	27.9	
Labour hold		Swing		

Lodge Park
Party	Candidate	Votes	%	±%
Labour	Richard Timney	896	62.0	
Conservative	Jack Field	235	16.3	
Independent	Davey James	162	11.2	
Liberal Democrats	Ian Webster	151	10.5	
Majority		661	45.8	
Turnout		1,444	28.3	
Labour hold		Swing		

Matchborough
Party	Candidate	Votes	%	±%
Labour	Michael Francis	1,004	52.2	
Conservative	Patricia Wilson	606	31.5	
Liberal Democrats	D Ward	315	16.4	
Majority		398	20.7	
Turnout		1,925	30.0	
Conservative gain from Labour		Swing		

West
Party	Candidate	Votes	%	±%
Conservative	Carole Gandy	924	48.8	
Labour	Raymond Beech	689	36.4	
Liberal Democrats	Michael Ashall	281	14.8	
Majority		235	12.4	
Turnout		1,894	32.5	
Conservative hold		Swing		

Winyates
Party	Candidate	Votes	%	±%
Liberal Democrats	Malcolm Hall	864	45.8	
Labour	Mark Shurmer	830	44.0	
Conservative	Gay Hopkins	142	7.5	
Green	Richard Armstrong	49	2.6	
Majority		34	1.8	
Turnout		1,885	38.1	
Liberal Democrats hold		Swing		
