= 2021 Redditch Borough Council election =

2021 UK local government election

← 2019	6 May 2021	2022 →

Third of the council, 9 seats 15 seats needed for a majority
	First party	Second party
Party	Conservative	Labour
Last election	16	11
Seats before	25	4
Seat change	▲7	▼7
Popular vote	9,054	5,026
Percentage	56.5%	31.3%
Council control before election
Conservative
Council control after election
Conservative

Map showing the results of the 2021 Redditch Borough Council election

The 2021 Redditch Borough Council elections took place on 6 May 2021 to elect members of Redditch Borough Council, a district-level local authority in Worcestershire, England.

== Results summary ==
2021 Redditch Borough Council election
Party	This election			Full council			This election		
Party	Seats	Net	Seats %	Other	Total	Total %	Votes	Votes %	+/−
Conservative	9	▲7	100.0	16	25	86.2	9,054	56.5	+16.0
Labour	0	▼7	0.0	4	4	13.8	5,026	31.3	+4.6
Liberal Democrats	0	Steady	0.0	0	0	0.0	913	5.7	-0.5
Green	0	Steady	0.0	0	0	0.0	883	5.5	-5.3
Independent	0	Steady	0.0	0	0	0.0	156	1.0	New

== Ward results ==
=== Batchley & Brockhill ===
Batchley & Brockhill
Party	Candidate	Votes	%	±%
Conservative	Lucy Harrison	1,152	58.4	+23.7
Labour	Phil Berry	682	34.5	+0.1
Green	Lea Room	140	7.1	±0.0
Majority		470	23.9	
Turnout		1,996	30.9	
Conservative gain from Labour		Swing	▲11.8	

=== Central ===
Central
Party	Candidate	Votes	%	±%
Conservative	Imran Altaf	702	45.3	+19.4
Labour	Greg Chance	657	42.4	−18.4
Green	Vicki Lees	109	7.0	+2.1
Liberal Democrats	David Gee	81	5.2	+0.9
Majority		45	2.9	
Turnout		1,565	34.8	
Conservative gain from Labour		Swing	▲18.9	

=== Church Hill ===
Church Hill
Party	Candidate	Votes	%	±%
Conservative	Karen Ashley	907	50.2	+16.3
Labour	Bill Hartnett	565	31.3	−1.6
Liberal Democrats	Mark Tomes	334	18.5	+12.1
Majority		342	18.9	
Turnout		1,899	32.3	
Conservative gain from Labour		Swing	▲9.0	

=== Greenlands ===
Greenlands
Party	Candidate	Votes	%	±%
Conservative	Emma Marshall	956	54.1	+17.2
Labour	Joe Baker	649	36.7	−2.9
Liberal Democrats	Tony Pitt	82	4.6	−5.9
Green	Rylma White	80	4.5	−8.5
Majority		307	17.4	
Turnout		1,780	26.1	
Conservative gain from Labour		Swing	▲10.1	

=== Headless Cross & Oakenshaw ===
Headless Cross & Oakenshaw
Party	Candidate	Votes	%	±%
Conservative	Aled Evans	1,436	62.9	+21.0
Labour	Lisa King	553	24.2	+2.4
Green	Alistair Waugh	163	7.1	−3.3
Liberal Democrats	John Marsh	130	5.7	−1.6
Majority		883	38.7	
Turnout		2,293	35.1	
Conservative hold		Swing	▲9.3	

=== Lodge Park ===
Lodge Park
Party	Candidate	Votes	%	±%
Conservative	Timothy Pearman	591	50.2	+22.4
Labour	Joanna Kane	487	41.4	−14.1
Green	Chris Hudson	65	5.6	+0.5
Liberal Democrats	Ian Webster	33	2.8	−1.0
Majority		104	8.8	
Turnout		1,182	31.0	
Conservative gain from Labour		Swing	▲18.3	

=== Matchborough ===
Matchborough
Party	Candidate	Votes	%	±%
Conservative	Alex Fogg	813	52.8	+12.0
Labour	Andrew Bevan	535	34.7	+3.8
Green	Claire Nicoll	109	7.1	−1.7
Liberal Democrats	Andy Thompson	83	5.4	N/A
Majority		278	18.1	
Turnout		1,554	34.3	
Conservative gain from Labour		Swing	▲4.1	

=== West ===
West
Party	Candidate	Votes	%	±%
Conservative	Matt Dormer	1,267	68.4	+20.4
Labour	Monica Fry	382	20.6	+1.0
Green	Simon Venables	112	6.0	−9.8
Liberal Democrats	Diane Thomas	91	4.9	N/A
Majority		885	47.8	
Turnout		1,860	38.2	
Conservative hold		Swing	▲9.7	

=== Winyates ===
Winyates
Party	Candidate	Votes	%	±%
Conservative	Luke Court	1,230	59.0	+19.2
Labour	Sharon Harvey	516	24.7	−1.8
Independent	Isabel Armstrong	156	7.5	N/A
Green	Gabby Hemming	105	5.0	−2.0
Liberal Democrats	Pamela Gee	79	3.8	−2.0
Majority		714	34.3	
Turnout		2,097	33.9	
Conservative gain from Labour		Swing	▲10.5	
