= 2023 Redditch Borough Council election =

Local election in England

← 2022	4 May 2023	2024 →

10 out of 29 seats on Redditch Borough Council 15 seats needed for a majority

	First party	Second party
Leader	Matthew Dormer	Joe Baker
Party	Conservative	Labour
Last election	20 seats, 43.9%	7 seats, 43.0%
Seats before	19 (Note: Includes one vacant seat in Crabbs Cross ward previously held by Conservative councillor Gareth Prosser until his death in January 2023.)	8
Seats after	16	13
Seat change	▼3	▲5
Popular vote	6,286	7,098
Percentage	38.8%	43.8%
	Third party	Fourth party
Party	Green	Independent
Last election	1 seat, 7.6%	1 seat, 3.4%
Seats before	1	1
Seats after	0	0
Seat change	▼1	▼1
Popular vote	1,317	332
Percentage	8.1%	2.0%
- 2023 local election results in Redditch
Leader before election
Matthew Dormer
Conservative
Leader after election
Matthew Dormer
Conservative

The 2023 Redditch Borough Council election took place on 4 May 2023 to elect members of Redditch Borough Council in Worcestershire, England. This was on the same day as other local elections across England. There were 10 of the 29 seats on the council up for election, being the usual nominal third of the council. The Conservatives retained control of the council.

== Results summary ==
Prior to the election the council was under Conservative majority control. Since this set of seats was last contested in 2019, two councillors defected from the Conservative Party: David Thain to the Green Party and Juliet Brunner to sit as an independent. These two councillors were up for re-election, but failed to be re-elected.

The Conservative Party lost an additional 4 seats at this election, but held 4 seats, and gained back the West ward from the Green Party.

The Labour Party held Greenlands and gained 5 seats, with 4 from the Conservatives, and Matchborough from the Independent.

This election saw the mayor, Ann Isherwood, lose her seat to 18-year-old James Fardoe. The deputy mayor, Tom Baker-Price, also lost his seat.

=== Results table ===
2023 Redditch Borough Council election
Party	This election			Full council			This election		
Party	Seats	Net	Seats %	Other	Total	Total %	Votes	Votes %	+/−
Conservative	4	▼5	40.0	12	16	55.2	6,286	38.8	-5.1
Labour	6	▲5	60.0	7	13	44.8	7,098	43.8	+0.8
Green	0	Steady	0.0	0	0	0.0	1,317	8.1	+0.5
Liberal Democrats	0	Steady	0.0	0	0	0.0	1,184	7.3	+2.4
Independent	0	Steady	0.0	0	0	0.0	332	2.0	+2.0

== Ward results ==
The results for each ward were as follows, with an asterisk (*) indicating an incumbent councillor standing for re-election:

=== Abbey ===
Abbey Ward
Party	Candidate	Votes	%	±%
Labour	Monica Stringfellow	894	54.0	+22.5
Conservative	Michael Chalk*	583	35.2	−5.5
Green	Margot Bish	115	6.9	−0.6
Liberal Democrats	Russell Taylor	65	3.9	−4.7
Majority		311	18.8	
Turnout		1659	32.88	
Labour gain from Conservative		Swing	▲14.0	

=== Astwood Bank & Feckenham ===
Astwood Bank and Feckenham Ward
Party	Candidate	Votes	%	±%
Conservative	Brandon Clayton*	794	50.7	0.1
Labour	Wanda King	520	33.2	16.8
Green	Glen Theobald	130	8.3	−0.5
Liberal Democrats	David Gee	122	7.8	−3.0
Majority		274	17.5	
Turnout		1572	33.29	
Conservative hold		Swing	▼8.4	

=== Batchley & Brockhill ===
Batchley and Brockhill Ward
Party	Candidate	Votes	%	±%
Labour	Kerrie Miles	981	57.4	23.2
Conservative	Helen Sanders	575	33.6	−0.9
Green	Lea Room	96	5.6	−1.5
Liberal Democrats	Roy Magara	57	3.3	−2.2
Majority		406	23.8	
Turnout		1713	26.07	
Labour gain from Conservative		Swing	▲12.1	

=== Church Hill ===
Church Hill Ward
Party	Candidate	Votes	%	±%
Labour	James Fardoe	791	46.8	14.1
Conservative	Ann Isherwood*	561	33.2	−0.5
Liberal Democrats	Mark Tomes	259	15.3	9.0
Green	Gabby Hemming	79	4.7	−1.6
Majority		230	13.6	
Turnout		1693	28.90	
Labour gain from Conservative		Swing	▲7.3	

=== Crabbs Cross ===
Crabbs Cross Ward
Party	Candidate	Votes	%	±%
Conservative	Chris Holz	615	43.4	5.1
Labour	Jim Heaney	596	42.1	28.8
Green	Claire Davies	114	8.0	−18.2
Liberal Democrats	Ann Gee	92	6.5	1.3
Majority		19	1.3	
Turnout		1425	32.79	
Conservative hold		Swing	▼11.9	

=== Greenlands ===
Greenlands Ward
Party	Candidate	Votes	%	±%
Labour	Juma Begum*	758	51.8	13.0
Conservative	Roger Bennett	532	36.4	0.3
Liberal Democrats	Diane Thomas	95	6.5	−3.7
Green	Steve Sergent	76	5.2	−7.5
Majority		226	15.5	
Turnout		1467	21.42	
Labour hold		Swing	▲6.4	

=== Headless Cross & Oakenshaw ===
Headless Cross and Oakenshaw Ward
Party	Candidate	Votes	%	±%
Labour	Ian Woodall	865	42.4	20.7
Conservative	Tom Baker-Price*	796	39.0	−2.7
Liberal Democrats	Andrew Fieldsend-Roxborough	269	13.2	5.9
Green	Alistair Waugh	110	5.4	−5.0
Majority		69	3.4	
Turnout		2047	31.88	
Labour gain from Conservative		Swing	▲11.7	

=== Matchborough ===
Matchborough Ward
Party	Candidate	Votes	%	±%
Labour	Jane Spilsbury	527	41.3	10.6
Independent	Juliet Brunner*	332	26.0	26.0
Conservative	Julian Grubb	311	24.4	−16.2
Liberal Democrats	Andy Thompson	53	4.2	4.2
Green	Kevin White	52	4.1	−4.6
Majority		195	15.3	
Turnout		1281	28.52	
Labour gain from Conservative		Swing		

=== West ===
West Ward
Party	Candidate	Votes	%	±%
Conservative	Gemma Monaco	633	41.2	−6.5
Green	David Thain*	443	28.8	13.1
Labour	Monica Fry	402	26.1	6.6
Liberal Democrats	Jo Tutt	60	3.9	3.9
Majority		190	12.4	
Turnout		1549	31.79	
Conservative hold		Swing	▼9.8	

=== Winyates ===
Winyates Ward
Party	Candidate	Votes	%	±%
Conservative	Peter Fleming*	886	47.5	8.0
Labour	Jen Snape	764	41.0	14.7
Liberal Democrats	Adam Smale	112	6.0	0.2
Green	Vicki Lees	102	5.5	−1.4
Majority		122	6.5	
Turnout		1877	30.22	
Conservative hold		Swing	▼3.4	

== Changes 2023–2024 ==
In January 2024 Kerrie Miles defected from Labour to the Liberal Democrats.
