= 2022 Redditch Borough Council election =

2022 UK local government election

← 2021	5 May 2022	2023 →

Third of the council, 11 seats 15 seats needed for a majority
	First party	Second party
Leader	Matt Dormer	Joe Baker
Party	Conservative	Labour
Leader's seat	West	Batchley & Brockhill
Last election	23	4
Seats before	20	7
Seat change	-3	+3
Council control before election
Conservative
Council control after election
Conservative

The 2022 Redditch Borough Council election took place on 5 May 2022 to elect members of Redditch Borough Council, a district-level local authority in Worcestershire, England.

2022 local election results in Redditch

== Results summary ==
2022 Redditch Borough Council election
Party	This election			Full council			This election		
Party	Seats	Net	Seats %	Other	Total	Total %	Votes	Votes %	+/−
Conservative	4	▼3	36.4	16	20	69.0	8,062	43.9	-12.6
Labour	7	▲3	63.6	0	7	24.1	7,895	43.0	+11.7
Green	0	Steady	0.0	1	1	3.4	1,398	7.6	+2.1
Independent	0	Steady	0.0	1	1	3.4	N/A	N/A	-1.0
Liberal Democrats	0	Steady	0.0	0	0	0.0	894	4.9	-0.8
Reform UK	0	Steady	0.0	0	0	0.0	103	0.6	N/A

== Ward results ==
=== Abbey ===
Abbey
Party	Candidate	Votes	%	±%
Labour	Sid Khan	870	44.4	+12.9
Conservative	Jamie Walsh	827	42.2	+1.5
Liberal Democrats	Andrew Fieldsend-Roxborough	156	8.0	−0.6
Green	Gabby Hemming	105	5.4	−2.3
Majority		43	2.2	
Turnout		1,969	39.2	
Labour gain from Conservative		Swing	▲5.7	

=== Astwood Bank & Feckenham ===
Astwood Bank & Feckenham
Party	Candidate	Votes	%	±%
Conservative	Craig Warhurst	931	55.0	+4.4
Labour	Wanda King	479	28.3	+11.9
Liberal Democrats	Ian Pickles	152	9.0	−1.8
Green	Glen Theobald	131	7.7	−1.1
Majority		452	26.7	
Turnout		1,698	35.6	
Conservative hold		Swing	▼3.8	

=== Batchley & Brockhill ===
Batchley & Brockhill
Party	Candidate	Votes	%	±%
Labour	Joe Baker	952	49.2	+14.7
Conservative	Gemma Monaco	792	40.9	−17.5
Reform UK	Frank Knight	103	5.3	N/A
Green	Lea Room	88	4.5	−2.6
Majority		160	8.3	
Turnout		1,942	29.6	
Labour gain from Conservative		Swing	▲16.1	

=== Central ===
Central
Party	Candidate	Votes	%	±%
Labour	Sharon Harvey	829	56.9	+14.5
Conservative	Ummar Memi	468	32.1	−13.2
Green	Victoria Lees	161	11.0	+4.0
Majority		361	24.8	
Turnout		1,468	32.3	
Labour hold		Swing	▲13.9	

=== Church Hill ===
Church Hill
Party	Candidate	Votes	%	±%
Labour	Bill Hartnett	794	43.5	+12.2
Conservative	Mike Rouse	729	39.9	−10.3
Liberal Democrats	Mark Tomes	218	11.9	−6.6
Green	Chris Hudson	85	4.7	N/A
Majority		65	3.6	
Turnout		1,833	31.3	
Labour gain from Conservative		Swing	▲11.3	

=== Crabbs Cross ===
Crabbs Cross
Party	Candidate	Votes	%	±%
Conservative	Salman Akbar	675	47.7	+9.4
Labour	Monica Fry	410	29.0	+15.7
Green	Claire Davies	245	17.3	−8.9
Liberal Democrats	David Gee	85	6.0	+0.8
Majority		265	18.7	
Turnout		1,426	32.2	
Conservative hold		Swing	▼3.2	

=== Greenlands ===
Greenlands (2 seats due to by-election)
Party	Candidate	Votes	%	±%
Labour	Joanna Kane	740	47.6	+10.9
Labour	Juma Begum	633	40.8	+4.1
Conservative	Lee Avery-Sherwood	627	40.4	−13.7
Conservative	Jo Monk	596	38.4	−15.7
Green	Steve Sergent	177	11.4	+6.9
Liberal Democrats	Simon Preston	158	10.2	+5.6
Turnout		1,553	22.7	
Labour hold		Swing		
Labour hold		Swing		

=== Headless Cross & Oakenshaw ===
Headless Cross & Oakenshaw
Party	Candidate	Votes	%	±%
Conservative	Jo Beecham	1,059	49.6	−13.3
Labour	Juliet Barker Smith	864	40.4	+16.2
Green	Alistair Waugh	214	10.0	+2.9
Majority		195	9.2	
Turnout		2,144	33.0	
Conservative hold		Swing	▼14.8	

=== Lodge Park ===
Lodge Park
Party	Candidate	Votes	%	±%
Labour	Andrew Fry	697	61.7	+20.3
Conservative	Chris Holz	361	32.0	−18.2
Green	Rylma White	71	6.3	+0.7
Majority		336	29.7	
Turnout		1,132	29.7	
Labour hold		Swing	▲19.3	

=== Winyates ===
Winyates
Party	Candidate	Votes	%	±%
Conservative	Anthony Lovell	997	53.3	−5.7
Labour	Ian Woodall	627	33.5	+8.8
Liberal Democrats	Ann Gee	125	6.7	+2.9
Green	Jem Bailey	121	6.5	+1.5
Majority		370	19.8	
Turnout		1,884	30.3	
Conservative hold		Swing	▼7.3	
