= 2004 Redditch Borough Council election =

2004 UK local government election

Map of the results

Elections to Redditch Borough Council were held on 10 June 2004. The whole council was up for election with boundary changes since the last election in 2003. The Labour Party gained overall control of the council from no overall control.

== Election result ==
Redditch local election result 2004
Party	Seats	Gains	Losses	Net gain/loss	Seats %	Votes %	Votes	+/−
Labour	16			+6	55.2	39.0	19,214	+2.5%
Conservative	10			-4	34.5	37.6	18,540	-0.5%
Liberal Democrats	3			-2	10.3	22.3	10,990	-3.1%
Independent	0			0	0	1.1	521	+1.1%

== Ward results ==
Abbey (2)
Party	Candidate	Votes	%	±%
Liberal Democrats	Diane Thomas	672		
Labour	Alan Mason	544		
Labour	Mohammad Nasir	512		
Conservative	Margaret Davies	508		
Liberal Democrats	Adam Isherwood	477		
Conservative	Paul Swansborough	399		
Independent	Eddie Smith	244		
Turnout		3,356	45.9	

Astwood Bank & Feckenham (2)
Party	Candidate	Votes	%	±%
Conservative	Antonia Pulsford	820		
Conservative	Michael Chalk	751		
Labour	Gail Stone	429		
Labour	Richard Timney	422		
Liberal Democrats	Graham Pollard	352		
Liberal Democrats	Renate Phillips	314		
Turnout		3,088	41.9	

Batchley (3)
Party	Candidate	Votes	%	±%
Labour	Jack Cookson	734		
Labour	Dorothy Dudley	734		
Labour	Betty Passingham	623		
Conservative	Gordon Craig	558		
Conservative	Patricia Wilson	542		
Conservative	Colin MacMillan	524		
Liberal Democrats	Grant Horne	216		
Liberal Democrats	Karen Weston	203		
Liberal Democrats	David Mews	202		
Turnout		4,336	29.5	

Central (2)
Party	Candidate	Votes	%	±%
Labour	Gregory Chance	682		
Labour	Debbie Taylor	668		
Conservative	Arjamand Farooqui	592		
Conservative	Dawn Shanahan	579		
Liberal Democrats	Emma Davis	281		
Liberal Democrats	Patricia Springhall	240		
Turnout		3,042	38.6	

Church Hill (3)
Party	Candidate	Votes	%	±%
Labour	Bill Hartnett	974		
Labour	Rebecca Blake	966		
Labour	David Hunt	909		
Liberal Democrats	David Gee	564		
Liberal Democrats	Robert Grice	542		
Liberal Democrats	Christopher Hennessey	528		
Conservative	Jason Allbutt	434		
Conservative	Betty Armstrong	422		
Conservative	Barry Gandy	360		
Turnout		5,699	33.2	

Crabbs Cross (2)
Party	Candidate	Votes	%	±%
Conservative	Jack Field	856		
Conservative	David Smith	827		
Labour	Helen Cartwright	413		
Labour	Terri Gallen	347		
Liberal Democrats	Brian Phillips	279		
Liberal Democrats	Barbara Nash	274		
Turnout		2,996	37.3	

Greenlands (3)
Party	Candidate	Votes	%	±%
Labour	Patricia Hill	786		
Labour	David Cartwright	777		
Labour	Philip Mould	772		
Conservative	John Bechaalani	473		
Conservative	Susan Anderson	471		
Conservative	Jean Smith	428		
Liberal Democrats	Anthony Pitt	303		
Independent	Myk Garrett	277		
Liberal Democrats	Audrey Hughes	237		
Liberal Democrats	David Hughes	220		
Turnout		4,744	29.0	

Headless Cross & Oakenshaw (3)
Party	Candidate	Votes	%	±%
Conservative	Peter Nightingale	1,174		
Conservative	Carole Gandy	1,170		
Conservative	Keith Boyd-Carpenter	1,141		
Labour	Raymond Beech	756		
Labour	Monica Fry	720		
Labour	Patricia Witherspoon	705		
Liberal Democrats	Heather Phillips	503		
Liberal Democrats	Peter Courts	441		
Liberal Democrats	John West	368		
Turnout		6,978	36.7	

Lodge Park (2)
Party	Candidate	Votes	%	±%
Labour	Mark Shurmer	690		
Labour	Andrew Fry	682		
Conservative	Gaynor Ward	346		
Conservative	Mohammad Farooqui	280		
Liberal Democrats	Ian Webster	211		
Liberal Democrats	Norman Wiley	169		
Turnout		2,378	35.4	

Matchborough (2)
Party	Candidate	Votes	%	±%
Labour	Iris Beech	664		
Conservative	Juliet Brunner	600		
Labour	Robin King	565		
Conservative	Gay Hopkins	554		
Liberal Democrats	Fiona Hicks	229		
Liberal Democrats	Mark Hathaway	221		
Turnout		2,833	33.6	

West (2)
Party	Candidate	Votes	%	±%
Conservative	Michael Braley	903		
Conservative	Gavin Smithers	848		
Labour	Clare Hopkins	453		
Labour	John Witherspoon	408		
Liberal Democrats	Caroline Ashall	317		
Liberal Democrats	Michael Ashall	308		
Turnout		3,236	38.0	

Winyates (3)
Party	Candidate	Votes	%	±%
Liberal Democrats	Malcolm Hall	809		
Liberal Democrats	Nigel Hicks	805		
Labour	Albert Wharrad	802		
Labour	Clive Cheetham	776		
Liberal Democrats	John Stanley	705		
Conservative	Brandon Clayton	704		
Labour	Stephen Wheeler	701		
Conservative	John Russell	666		
Conservative	Gordon Kenney	610		
Turnout		6,578	36.1	
