= 2026 Redditch Borough Council election =

2026 English local government election

- 7 May 2026

9 out of 27 seats to Redditch Borough Council 14 seats needed for a majority
	First party	Second party	Third party
Leader	Sharon Harvey		Matt Dormer
Party	Labour	Reform	Conservative
Last election	21 seats, 48.2%	Did not stand	4 seats, 37.2%
Seats before	18	0	5
Seats won	1	8	0
Seats after	13	8	4
Seat change	▼5	▲8	▼1
Popular vote	4,510	9,581	4,791
Percentage	18.4%	39.2%	19.6%
Swing	▼29.8%	N/A	▼17.6%
	Fourth party	Fifth party
Party	Independent	Green
Last election	1 seats, 0.7%	1 seat, 8.7%
Seats before	3	1
Seats won	0	0
Seats after	2	0
Seat change	▼1	▼1
Popular vote	Did not stand	4,169
Percentage	Did not stand	17.0%
Swing	▼0.7%	▲8.3%
- Winner of each seat at the 2026 Redditch Borough Council election.
Leader before election
Sharon Harvey
Labour
Leader after election
Matt Dormer
Conservative
No overall control

The 2026 Redditch Borough Council election was held on 7 May 2026, alongside the other local elections across the United Kingdom being held on the same day, to elect 9 of 27 members of Redditch Borough Council in Worcestershire, England.

Prior to the election the council was under Labour majority control. At this election, the council went under no overall control. Labour remained the largest party, but fell one seat short of a majority. Reform UK, which held no seats prior to the election, won eight of the nine seats being contested, making them the second largest party on the council after Labour. At the subsequent annual council meeting on 26 May 2026, the incumbent Labour leader of the council, Sharon Harvey, was removed from the post, and the Conservative group leader, Matt Dormer, was appointed as leader of the council instead. This was despite the Conservatives only having four councillors and only being the third largest party on the council. Dormer's appointment was voted for by Reform and the independent councillors as well as his own party. He appointed an executive comprising all four Conservative councillors and two of the independent councillors. Reform's support was on the basis of a confidence and supply agreement rather than a coalition, in exchange for which Reform councillors were appointed to the roles of mayor, deputy mayor and several of the committee chairmanships.

== Summary ==
=== Background ===
In 2024, the Labour Party retained majority control of the council. In January 2026, the council asked for the election to be postponed pending local government reorganisation. However it was rescheduled on 16 February 2026.

On 10 March 2026, the leader of Redditch Council Conservative group and councillor for Webheath and Callow Hill, Matt Dormer, was suspended by the Conservative party after he was linked to a potential defection to Reform UK. The suspension was lifted a few days before the election and he was reinstated to the party.

=== Election result ===
2026 Redditch Borough Council election
Party	This election				Full council			This election		
Party	Candidates	Seats	Net	Seats %	Other	Total	Total %	Votes	Votes %	+/−
Labour	{{{candidates}}}	1	▼5	11.1	12	13	48.1	4,510	18.4	–29.8
Reform	{{{candidates}}}	8	▲1	88.9	0	8	29.6	9,581	39.2	N/A
Conservative	{{{candidates}}}	0	▼1	0.0	4	4	14.8	4,791	19.6	–17.6
Independent	{{{candidates}}}	0	▼1	0.0	2	2	7.4	N/A (Note: Did not stand candidates.)	N/A	–0.7
Green	{{{candidates}}}	0	▼1	0.0	0	0	0.0	4,169	17.0	+8.3
Liberal Democrats	{{{candidates}}}	0	Steady	0.0	0	0	0.0	1,408	5.8	+0.6

== Incumbents ==
Ward	Incumbent councillor	Party	Re-standing
Astwood & Freckenham	Chris Holz	Conservative	Yes
Batchley & Brockhill	Sachin Mathur	Labour	No
Central	Gary Slim	Labour	Yes
Greenlands & Lakeside	Juma Begum	Labour	Yes
Headless Cross & Oakenshaw	David Munro	Labour	Yes
Matchborough & Woodrow	Paul Wren	Labour	No
North	Sid Khan	Independent	No
Webheath & Callow Hill	Claire Davies	Green	Yes
Winyates	Alan Mason	Labour	No

== Ward results ==
=== Astwood Bank & Feckenham ===
Astwood Bank & Feckenham
Party	Candidate	Votes	%	±%
Reform	Roger Bennett	1,140	36.8	N/A
Conservative	Christopher Holz*	990	31.9	–11.6
Labour	Monica Fry	425	13.7	–23.2
Green	Kevin White	369	11.9	+0.5
Liberal Democrats	John Marsh	176	5.7	–2.5
Majority		150	4.8	N/A
Turnout		3,117	45.1	+13.4
Registered electors		6,914		
Reform gain from Conservative				

=== Batchley & Brockhill ===
Batchley & Brockhill
Party	Candidate	Votes	%	±%
Reform	Ashley Monk	1,038	39.8	N/A
Labour	Mark Tomes	533	20.4	–29.8
Green	Lisa King	512	19.6	+10.5
Conservative	Julian Grubb	400	15.3	–15.1
Liberal Democrats	Kerrie Coope	125	4.8	–5.5
Majority		505	19.4	N/A
Turnout		2,619	35.2	+8.3
Registered electors		7,437		
Reform gain from Labour				

=== Central ===
Central
Party	Candidate	Votes	%	±%
Labour	Gary Slim*	652	30.6	–24.3
Reform	Stephen Lloyd	614	28.8	N/A
Green	Tim Bradley	555	26.0	+11.2
Conservative	Alan Smith	237	11.1	–7.7
Liberal Democrats	Pamela Gee	74	3.5	–7.9
Majority		38	1.8	N/A
Turnout		2,150	30.8	+5.4
Registered electors		6,987		
Labour hold				

=== Greenlands & Lakeside ===
Greenlands & Lakeside
Party	Candidate	Votes	%	±%
Reform	Nikki Lloyd	1,086	40.8	N/A
Labour	Juma Begum*	652	24.5	–28.4
Green	Margot Bish	385	14.5	+2.1
Conservative	David Bowater	381	14.3	–11.4
Liberal Democrats	Anthony Pitt	158	5.9	–3.1
Majority		434	16.3	N/A
Turnout		2,669	35.2	+9.0
Registered electors		7,581		
Reform gain from Labour				

=== Headless Cross & Oakenshaw ===
Headless Cross & Oakenshaw
Party	Candidate	Votes	%	±%
Reform	Susan Eacock	1,190	39.3	N/A
Labour	David Munro*	595	19.7	–26.8
Conservative	Kyle Wakefield	526	17.4	–18.5
Green	Ben Bradley	378	12.5	+1.2
Liberal Democrats	Andrew Fieldsend-Roxborough	338	11.2	+5.0
Majority		595	19.7	N/A
Turnout		3,038	42.7	+9.5
Registered electors		7,121		
Reform gain from Labour				

=== Matchborough & Woodrow ===
Matchborough & Woodrow
Party	Candidate	Votes	%	±%
Reform	David Meredith	947	42.6	N/A
Conservative	Juliet Brunner	453	20.4	–4.9
Labour	Mark Harvey	421	18.9	–22.5
Green	Keith Manning	296	13.3	+3.3
Liberal Democrats	David Gee	107	4.8	–1.8
Majority		494	22.2	N/A
Turnout		2,229	29.5	+5.9
Registered electors		7,566		
Reform gain from Labour				

=== North ===
North
Party	Candidate	Votes	%	±%
Reform	Nic Pioli	1,177	43.2	N/A
Conservative	Karen Ashley	600	22.0	–15.3
Labour	Debbie Chance	496	18.2	–25.0
Green	Adam Price	275	10.1	+1.5
Liberal Democrats	Andy Thompson	178	6.5	–4.5
Majority		577	21.2	N/A
Turnout		2,732	38.6	+8.1
Registered electors		7,078		
Reform gain from Independent				

=== Webheath & Callow Hill ===
Webheath & Callow Hill
Party	Candidate	Votes	%	±%
Reform	Simon Farmer	1,177	35.4	N/A
Green	Claire Davies*	1,072	32.3	–2.6
Conservative	Finlay Heath	720	21.7	–18.9
Labour	Paul Wren	261	7.9	–12.0
Liberal Democrats	Edward Killworth	93	2.8	–1.8
Majority		105	3.2	N/A
Turnout		3,328	46.6	+11.1
Registered electors		7,139		
Reform gain from Green				

=== Winyates ===
Winyates
Party	Candidate	Votes	%	±%
Reform	James Aston	1,212	45.6	N/A
Conservative	Anita Clayton	484	18.2	–18.8
Labour	Jim Heaney	475	17.9	–21.6
Green	Clare Beckhelling	327	12.3	–0.9
Liberal Democrats	Jade Taylor	159	6.0	–4.3
Majority		728	27.4	N/A
Turnout		2,663	39.1	+7.0
Registered electors		6,817		
Reform gain from Labour				
