= 2019 Redditch Borough Council election =

2019 UK local government election

← 2018	2 May 2019	2021 →

Third of the council, 10 seats 15 seats needed for a majority
	First party	Second party
Leader	Matt Dormer	Bill Hartnett
Party	Conservative	Labour
Leader's seat	West	Church Hill
Last election	17	12
Seats before	18	11
Seat change	▲1	▼1
Popular vote	6,670	4,395
Percentage	40.5%	26.7%
Council control before election
Conservative
Council control after election
Conservative

Map showing the results of the 2019 Redditch Borough Council election

The 2019 Redditch Borough Council elections took place on 2 May 2019 to elect members of Redditch Borough Council, a district-level local authority in Worcestershire, England.

== Results summary ==
Redditch local election result 2019
Party	Seats	Gains	Losses	Net gain/loss	Seats %	Votes %	Votes	+/−
Conservative	18	1	0	+1	62.0	40.5	6,670	-709
Labour	11	0	1	-1	38.0	26.7	4,395	-2,270
UKIP	0	0	0	0	0.0	15.8	2,603	+1,279
Green	0	0	0	0	0.0	10.8	1,782	+909
Liberal Democrats	0	0	0	0	0.0	6.2	1,015	+479

== Ward results ==
=== Abbey ===
Abbey Ward
Party	Candidate	Votes	%	±%
Conservative	Mike Chalk	668	40.7	−5.8
Labour	Nayab Patel	517	31.5	−10.1
UKIP	Sandra Swansborough	191	11.6	+8.5
Liberal Democrats	Russell Taylor	141	8.6	+2.8
Green	Gabby Hemming	126	7.7	+4.6
Majority		151		+71
Turnout		1,650	35.85	−1.57
Conservative hold		Swing	▲2.2	

=== Astwood Bank & Feckenham ===
Astwood Bank & Feckenham Ward
Party	Candidate	Votes	%	±%
Conservative	Brandon Clayton	813	50.6	−14.4
Labour	Benjamin Gibbs	263	16.4	−6.3
UKIP	Bernard Pritchard	207	12.9	+9.4
Liberal Democrats	John Marsh	173	10.8	+10.8
Green	Lea Room	141	8.8	+0.6
Majority		550		−151
Turnout		1,606	34.32	−1.29
Conservative hold		Swing	▼4.05	

=== Batchley & Brockhill ===
Batchley and Brockhill Ward
Party	Candidate	Votes	%	±%
Conservative	Nyear Nazir	583	34.5	−12.2
Labour	Phil Berry	579	34.2	−10.6
UKIP	Melvin Haigh	307	18.1	+14.1
Green	Steve Pound	120	7.1	+3.2
Liberal Democrats	Ian Webster	93	5.5	+5.5
Majority		4		−28
Turnout		1,692	27.72	−1.62
Conservative hold		Swing	▼0.8	

=== Church Hill ===
Church Hill Ward
Party	Candidate	Votes	%	±%
Conservative	Ann Isherwood	573	33.7	−8.7
Labour	Hannah Cartwright	556	32.7	−9.6
UKIP	Kathy Haslam	348	20.4	+13.5
Liberal Democrats	David Gee	108	6.3	+1.5
Green	Bob Wardell	107	6.3	+3.3
Majority		17		+16
Turnout		1,702	29.58	−1.51
Conservative gain from Labour		Swing	▲0.5	

=== Crabbs Cross ===
Crabbs Cross Ward
Party	Candidate	Votes	%	±%
Conservative	Gareth Prosser	567	38.3	−11.7
Green	Claire Davies	388	26.2	+17.2
UKIP	Chris Harrison	249	16.8	+8.0
Labour	Monica Fry	197	13.3	−13.7
Liberal Democrats	Pamela Gee	77	5.2	+0.1
Majority		179		−160
Turnout		1,482	33.31	+0.02
Conservative hold		Swing		

=== Greenlands ===
Greenlands Ward
Party	Candidate	Votes	%	±%
Labour	Jennifer Wheeler	602	38.8	−8.1
Conservative	Luke Court	561	36.1	+2.1
Green	Rylma White	197	12.7	+8.3
Liberal Democrats	Tony Pitt	159	10.2	3.7
Majority		41		−165
Turnout		1,553	23.29	−1.19
Labour hold		Swing	▼5.1	

=== Headless Cross & Oakenshaw ===
Headless Cross & Oakenshaw Ward
Party	Candidate	Votes	%	±%
Conservative	Tom Baker-Price	846	41.7	−9.2
Labour	John Witherspoon	441	21.7	−13.5
UKIP	Trevor Magner	374	18.4	+11.7
Green	Alistair Waugh	211	10.4	+3.6
Liberal Democrats	Andy Thompson	148	7.3	+7.3
Majority		405		+57
Turnout		2,030	31.15	−3.11
Conservative hold		Swing	▲2.2	

=== Matchborough ===
Matchborough Ward
Party	Candidate	Votes	%	±%
Conservative	Juliet Brunner	562	40.6	
Labour	Andrew Bevan	425	30.7	
UKIP	Jim Swansborough	268	19.4	
Green	Victoria Lees	121	8.7	
Majority		137		
Turnout		1,385	31.07	−1.07
Conservative hold		Swing		

=== West ===
West Ward
Party	Candidate	Votes	%	±%
Conservative	David Thain	706	47.7	
Labour	Lisa King	288	19.5	
UKIP	Paul Swansborough	246	16.6	
Green	Simon Venables	232	15.7	
Majority		418		
Turnout		1,480	32.43	+0.21
Conservative hold		Swing		

=== Winyates ===
Winyates Ward
Party	Candidate	Votes	%	±%
Conservative	Peter Fleming	791	39.5	−0.5
Labour	Jim Heaney	527	26.3	−3.0
UKIP	Scott Preston	413	20.6	−2.4
Green	Steve Sargent	139	6.9	+3.2
Liberal Democrats	Diane Thomas	116	5.8	+2.7
Majority		264		+34
Turnout		2,002	32.89	−2.35
Conservative hold		Swing	▲1.3	
