= 2018 Redditch Borough Council election =

2018 UK local government election

← 2016	3 May 2018	2019 →

Third of the council, 10 seats 15 seats needed for a majority
	First party	Second party	Third party
Leader	Juliet Brunner	Bill Hartnett	Paul Swansborough
Party	Conservative	Labour	UKIP
Leader's seat	Matchborough	Church Hill	Winyates (lost re-election)
Last election	13	15	1
Seats after	17	12	0
Seat change	▲4	▼3	▼1
Popular vote	7,379	6,665	1,324
Percentage	43.98%	39.73%	7.89%
- 2018 local election results in Redditch
Council control before election
Labour
Council control after election
Conservative

The 2018 Redditch Borough Council election took place on 3 May 2018 to elect members of Redditch Borough Council in England. The Conservatives won control of the council from Labour with 17 seats, compared to 12 for Labour and 0 for the UKIP.

== Background ==
Redditch Borough Council was one of the smallest councils in England to hold elections in 2018 and ten of its 29 councillors were up for election. The election came with the Labour majority council being under criticism for "controversial" proposals for four new 'quarters' of Redditch, the demolition of the library and police station and the relocation of the borough's civic headquarters.

Three sitting councillors did not seek re-election at this election (1 Labour, 2 Conservatives).

The Conservatives ultimately gained four seats to take their total to 17 and which meant that they took control of the council, the only example of a direct change of power from Labour to Conservatives at these elections. Labour lost three seats while UKIP lost its last remaining councillor in the Winyates ward. The result also meant that Labour no longer controlled any local authority in Worcestershire.

== Results summary ==
Redditch local election result 2018
Party	Seats	Gains	Losses	Net gain/loss	Seats %	Votes %	Votes	+/−
Labour	12	0	3	-3	41.0	39.73	6,665	
Conservative	17	4	0	+4	59.0	43.98	7,379	
Green	0	0	0	0	0.0	5.20	873	
Liberal Democrats	0	0	0	0	0.0	3.19	536	
UKIP	0	0	1	-1	0.0	7.89	1,324	

== Ward results ==
=== Abbey ===
Abbey Ward
Party	Candidate	Votes	%	±%
Conservative	Julian Grubb	767	46.3	
Labour	Nayab Patel	687	41.5	
Liberal Democrats	Russel Taylor	95	5.7	
UKIP	Sandra Swansborough	52	3.1	
Green	Gabby Hemming	50	3.0	
Majority		80	4.83	
Turnout		1,655	37.4	
Conservative gain from Labour		Swing		

=== Astwood Bank & Feckenham ===
Astwood Bank & Feckenham Ward
Party	Candidate	Votes	%	±%
Conservative	Craig Warhurst	1,077	65.4	
Labour	David McDonald	376	22.8	
Green	Simon Venables	136	8.3	
UKIP	Bernard Pritchard	59	3.6	
Majority		701		
Turnout		1,649	35.6	
Conservative hold		Swing		

=== Batchley & Brockhill ===
Batchley & Brockhill Ward
Party	Candidate	Votes	%	±%
Conservative	Gemma Monaco	809	46.9	
Labour	Natalie Brooks	777	45.0	
UKIP	Melvin Haigh	71	4.1	
Green	Steven Pound	68	3.9	
Majority		32		
Turnout		1,727	29.4	
Conservative gain from Labour		Swing		

=== Central ===
Central Ward
Party	Candidate	Votes	%	±%
Labour	Debbie Chance	883	60.8	
Conservative	Kurt Warhurst	376	25.9	
Green	Rachel Wardell	71	4.9	
Liberal Democrats	Diane Thomas	63	4.3	
UKIP	Jim Swansborough	60	4.1	
Majority		507		
Turnout		1,457	33.8	
Labour hold		Swing		

=== Church Hill ===
Church Hill Ward
Party	Candidate	Votes	%	±%
Conservative	Mike Rouse	766	42.56	19.60
Labour	Nina Wood-Ford	765	42.50	9.89
UKIP	Kathy Haslam	128	7.11	−28.15
Liberal Democrats	David Gee	87	4.83	
Green	Robert Wardell	54	3.00	
Majority		1		
Turnout		1,802	31.1	
Conservative gain from Labour		Swing	14.74	

=== Crabbs Cross ===
Crabbs Cross Ward
Party	Candidate	Votes	%	±%
Conservative	Salman Akbar	737	50.0	
Labour	Monica Fry	398	27.0	
Green	Claire Davies	133	9.0	
UKIP	Chris Harrison	130	8.8	
Liberal Democrats	Ann Gee	75	5.1	
Majority		339		
Turnout		1,476	33.3	
Conservative hold		Swing		

=== Greenlands ===
Greenlands Ward
Party	Candidate	Votes	%	±%
Labour	Wanda King	762	47.8	
Conservative	David Checkley	556	34.9	
Liberal Democrats	Tony Pitt	108	6.8	
UKIP	Scott Preston	95	6.0	
Green	Rylma White	74	4.6	
Majority		206		
Turnout		1,598	24.5	
Labour hold		Swing		

=== Headless Cross & Oakenshaw ===
Headless Cross & Oakenshaw Ward
Party	Candidate	Votes	%	±%
Conservative	Joanne Beecham	1,128	51.0	
Labour	Phil Berry	780	35.3	
UKIP	Trevor Magner	151	6.8	
Green	Alistair Waugh	151	6.8	
Majority		348		
Turnout		2,216	34.3	
Conservative hold		Swing		

=== Lodge Park ===
Lodge Park Ward
Party	Candidate	Votes	%	±%
Labour	Andrew Fry	610	55.5	
Conservative	Nicolas Houslip	306	27.8	
UKIP	Trevor Blake	85	7.7	
Green	Kevin White	56	5.1	
Liberal Democrats	Ian Webster	42	3.8	
Majority		304		
Turnout		1,099	29.6	
Labour hold		Swing		

=== Winyates ===
Winyates Ward
Party	Candidate	Votes	%	±%
Conservative	Anthony Lovell	857	40.4	
Labour	Jim Heaney	627	29.5	
UKIP	Paul Swansborough	493	23.2	
Green	Angela Day	80	3.8	
Liberal Democrats	Hans Windheuser	66	3.1	
Majority		230		
Turnout		2,127	35.2	
Conservative gain from UKIP		Swing		
