= 2012 Redditch Borough Council election =

2012 UK local government election

Map of the results

The 2012 Redditch Borough Council election for the Redditch Borough Council was held on 3 May 2012. All council wards, apart from Abbey, Astwood Bank and Feckenham, and Crabbs Cross and Rural wards, voted in the local elections. In the Church Hill ward, two councillors were up for election, due to a by-election which was called after the death of Labour councillor Robin King, who died in February 2012.

== Election results ==
Redditch local election result 2012
Party	Seats	Gains	Losses	Net gain/loss	Seats %	Votes %	Votes	+/−
Conservative	14	0	3	-3	48.3	33.0	5,009	
Labour	15	4	0	+4	51.7	47.8	7,246	
Liberal Democrats	0	0	1	-1	0.0	9.7	1,471	
Green	0	0	0	0	0.0	7.2	1,086	
Independent	0	0	0	0	0.0	2.3	344	

All parties received fewer votes compared to 2011. This is probably due to low turnouts across Redditch and because Astwood Bank and Feckenham ward and Crabbs Cross and Rural Ward were not voting. These wards normally have higher than average turnouts.

== Ward results ==
=== Batchley and Brockhill Ward ===
Batchley and Brockhill Ward
Party	Candidate	Votes	%	±%
Labour	Pattie Hill	816		
Conservative	Tom Baker-Price	410		
Liberal Democrats	Peter Merricks	168		
Green	Loretta Griffin	108		
Majority		406		
Turnout		1,512	26.2%	
Labour gain from Conservative		Swing		

=== Central Ward ===
Central Ward
Party	Candidate	Votes	%	±%
Labour	Greg Chance	763		
Conservative	David Smith	351		
Green	Mohammed Khan	104		
Liberal Democrats	Diane Thomas	79		
Majority		412		
Turnout		1,303	27.9%	
Labour hold		Swing		

=== Church Hill Ward ===
Church Hill Ward
Party	Candidate	Votes	%	±%
Labour	Bill Hartnett	883		
Labour	Pat Witherspoon	793		
Conservative	Kathy Haslam	466		
Conservative	Kath Banks	430		
Liberal Democrats	Daniel Taylor	106		
Liberal Democrats	David Gee	102		
Green	Lee Bradley	90		
Green	Rosemary Kerry	71		
Independent	Isabel Armstrong	51		
Independent	Richard Armstrong	47		
Independent	Agnes Wiecek	41		
Majority		417		
Majority		327		
Turnout		1,624	26.1%	
Labour hold		Swing		
Labour hold		Swing		

=== Greenlands Ward ===
Greenlands Ward
Party	Candidate	Votes	%	±%
Labour	Joe Baker	877		
Conservative	William Norton	391		
Liberal Democrats	Anthony Pitt	120		
Green	Rylma White	120		
Majority		486		
Turnout		1,517	23.8%	
Labour gain from Conservative		Swing		

=== Headless Cross & Oakenshaw Ward ===
Headless Cross & Oakenshaw Ward
Party	Candidate	Votes	%	±%
Conservative	Roger Bennett	910		
Labour	Yassar Mahmood	592		
Green	Alistair Waugh	235		
Liberal Democrats	John Stanley	167		
Majority		318		
Turnout		1,911	27.9%	
Conservative hold		Swing		

=== Lodge Park Ward ===
Lodge Park Ward
Party	Candidate	Votes	%	±%
Labour	Mark Shurmer	704		
Conservative	Jean Smith	258		
Green	Kevin White	86		
Liberal Democrats	Ian Webster	48		
Independent	Orion Monn	6		
Independent	Pam Moon	5		
Majority		446		
Turnout		1,114	27.7%	
Labour hold		Swing		

=== Matchborough Ward ===
Matchborough Ward
Party	Candidate	Votes	%	±%
Labour	John Fisher	699		
Conservative	Anita Clayton	609		
Green	Emma Bradley	114		
Liberal Democrats	Simon Oliver	78		
Majority		90		
Turnout		1,505	32.8%	
Labour gain from Conservative		Swing		

=== West Ward ===
West Ward
Party	Candidate	Votes	%	±%
Conservative	Michael Braley	767		
Labour	John Witherspoon	396		
Green	Louise Deveney	103		
Liberal Democrats	Rita Hindle	79		
Majority		371		
Turnout		1,353	29.8%	
Conservative hold		Swing		

=== Winyates Ward ===
Winyates Ward
Party	Candidate	Votes	%	±%
Labour	Yvonne Smith	723		
Liberal Democrats	Malcolm Hall	524		
Conservative	Michael Slevin	417		
Independent	Paul Swansborough	194		
Green	Bev Minto	55		
Majority		199		
Turnout		1,917	29.6%	
Labour gain from Liberal Democrats		Swing		
