= 2003 Redditch Borough Council election =

2003 UK local government election

The 2003 Redditch Borough Council election took place on 1 May 2003 to elect members of Redditch Borough Council in the West Midlands region, England. One third of the council was up for election and the council stayed under no overall control.

After the election, the composition of the council was:

- Conservative 14
- Labour 10
- Liberal Democrat 5

== Campaign ==
The Conservative Party was hoping to gain control over the council, which before the election was controlled by Labour with the support of the Liberal Democrats. 10 seats were being contested with the Labour Party defending 6 of the seats. Labour needed to gain one seat to regain their majority, while the Conservatives needed 3 gains to also win a majority. The key wards targeted by the Conservatives were Central, Greenlands and Lodge Park.

The Conservatives were hoping to gain from voters who were unhappy over council tax rises and they pledged to only increase it by the inflation rate over the next three years if they won control. Meanwhile, Labour pledged to use new powers to tackle anti-social behaviour and said they were making a difference in the town. Other issues raised in the election included an Audit Commission report on the housing department and the poor use of tourist attractions in the borough.

== Election result ==
The results saw the Labour Party lose four seats, two each to the Conservatives and Liberal Democrats. The Liberal Democrats gained in Church Hill and Winyates, while the Conservatives gained Central and Greenlands. Among the Labour losses was the wife of the Labour leader, Helen Cartwright, and the planning committee chairman, Clive Cheetham. The new Conservative councillor from Central ward, Mohammed Farooqui, became the youngest member of the council at the age of 24.

As a result, the Conservatives became the largest party on the council with 14 seats. They had only just missed winning a majority on the council after failing to gain Lodge Park by 64 votes.

Redditch local election result 2003
Party	Seats	Gains	Losses	Net gain/loss	Seats %	Votes %	Votes	+/−
Conservative	4	2	0	+2	40.0	38.1	5,736	-4.5
Labour	3	0	4	-4	30.0	36.5	5,496	+3.5
Liberal Democrats	3	2	0	+2	30.0	25.4	3,821	+2.2

== Ward results ==
Abbey
Party	Candidate	Votes	%	±%
Liberal Democrats	Nigel Hicks	787	71.0	+7.3
Labour	Alan Mason	322	29.0	+6.7
Majority		465	42.0	+0.6
Turnout		1,109	27.5	
Liberal Democrats hold		Swing		

Batchley
Party	Candidate	Votes	%	±%
Labour	Dorothy Dudley	630	46.5	−5.5
Conservative	Peter Anderson	486	35.9	+1.6
Liberal Democrats	Kathleen Cummings	238	17.6	+4.0
Majority		144	10.6	−7.1
Turnout		1,354	23.0	
Labour hold		Swing		

Central
Party	Candidate	Votes	%	±%
Conservative	Mohammed Farooqui	735	43.8	−3.3
Labour	Ronald Passingham	642	38.3	−1.7
Liberal Democrats	Robert Hanna	301	17.9	+4.9
Majority		93	5.5	−1.6
Turnout		1,678	31.9	
Conservative gain from Labour		Swing		

Church Hill
Party	Candidate	Votes	%	±%
Liberal Democrats	David Gee	668	46.4	
Labour	David Hunt	594	41.3	
Conservative	Richard Lumley	177	12.3	
Majority		74	5.1	
Turnout		1,439	28.5	
Liberal Democrats gain from Labour		Swing		

Crabbs Cross
Party	Candidate	Votes	%	±%
Conservative	John Field	814	55.3	+4.8
Labour	Gareth Young	465	31.6	−5.7
Liberal Democrats	Graham Pollard	193	13.1	+0.8
Majority		349	23.7	+10.5
Turnout		1,472	26.2	
Conservative hold		Swing		

Greenlands
Party	Candidate	Votes	%	±%
Conservative	Michael Braley	737	43.4	+0.8
Labour	Helen Cartwright	668	39.3	−4.5
Liberal Democrats	Anthony Pitt	294	17.3	+3.7
Majority		69	4.1	
Turnout		1,699	26.9	
Conservative gain from Labour		Swing		

Lodge Park
Party	Candidate	Votes	%	±%
Labour	Mark Shurmer	682	46.6	+11.0
Conservative	Jean Smith	619	42.3	+8.4
Liberal Democrats	Ian Webster	163	11.1	−3.9
Majority		63	4.3	+2.6
Turnout		1,464	29.7	
Labour hold		Swing		

Matchborough
Party	Candidate	Votes	%	±%
Conservative	Gordon Kenney	842	53.6	+2.8
Labour	Roy Vickers	451	28.7	−4.7
Liberal Democrats	Christopher Hennessey	278	17.7	+1.9
Majority		391	24.9	+7.5
Turnout		1,571	25.3	
Conservative hold		Swing		

West
Party	Candidate	Votes	%	±%
Conservative	Patricia Wilson	1,208	62.1	
Labour	Patricia Witherspoon	430	22.1	
Liberal Democrats	Michael Ashall	307	15.8	
Majority		778	40.0	
Turnout		1,945	30.8	
Conservative hold		Swing		

Winyates
Party	Candidate	Votes	%	±%
Liberal Democrats	John Stanley	592	44.8	−6.9
Labour	Clive Cheetham	519	39.3	+0.9
Conservative	Juliet Brunner	211	16.0	+6.1
Majority		73	5.5	−7.8
Turnout		1,322	27.8	
Liberal Democrats gain from Labour		Swing		
