= 2000 Redditch Borough Council election =

2000 UK local government election

The 2000 Redditch Borough Council election took place on 4 May 2000 to elect members of Redditch Borough Council in Worcestershire, England. One third of the council was up for election and the Labour Party stayed in overall control of the council.

After the election, the composition of the council was:

- Labour 17
- Conservative 10
- Liberal Democrat 2

== Campaign ==
The Labour Party defended seven of the nine seats that were up for election in the election with the opposition parties hoping to make gains. A significant issue in the election were plans to close or merge ten schools in the borough. On election day itself a mother who had two children at one of the schools which was to be closed chained herself outside of a polling station to protest against the closures. Meanwhile, the Labour Party campaigned on their development plans, community action and CCTV plans and neighbourhood groups.

The election saw a trial of early voting with voting booths open for over a week before election day. Approximately 1.5% of the electorate voted early in the trial.

== Election result ==
The Conservatives gained four seats in the election in Greenlands, Matchborough, Central and Feckenham wards. It was the first time in twenty years that the Conservatives had won a seat in Greenlands.

Redditch local election result 2000
Party	Seats	Gains	Losses	Net gain/loss	Seats %	Votes %	Votes	+/−
Conservative	5			+4	55.6			
Labour	4			-3	44.4			
Liberal Democrats	0			-1	0			
