= 2006 Redditch Borough Council election =

2006 UK local government election

Map of the results

2006 elections to Redditch Borough Council were held on 4 May 2006. One third of the council was up for election and the Labour Party lost overall control of the council to no overall control.

After the election, the composition of the council was:

- Labour 14
- Conservative 11
- Liberal Democrat 3
- British National Party 1

== Election result ==
Redditch local election result 2006
Party	Seats	Gains	Losses	Net gain/loss	Seats %	Votes %	Votes	+/−
Labour	5	0	2	-2	50.0	34.3	6,449	-4.7%
Conservative	4	1	0	+1	40.0	40.2	7,564	+2.6%
BNP	1	1	0	+1	10.0	4.7	890	+4.7%
Liberal Democrats	0	0	0	0	0	20.7	3,894	-1.6%

== Ward results ==
Abbey
Party	Candidate	Votes	%	±%
Conservative	Colin MacMillan	578	34.7	
Labour	Alan Mason	545	32.7	
Liberal Democrats	John Stanley	543	32.6	
Majority		33	2.0	
Turnout		1,666	42.0	−3.9
Conservative gain from Labour		Swing		

Astwood Bank & Feckenham
Party	Candidate	Votes	%	±%
Conservative	Michael Chalk	1,112	63.1	
Liberal Democrats	Graham Pollard	337	19.1	
Labour	Robin King	312	17.7	
Majority		775	44.0	
Turnout		1,761	40.1	−1.8
Conservative hold		Swing		

Batchley
Party	Candidate	Votes	%	±%
Labour	Betty Passingham	787	43.5	
Conservative	Dawn Shanahan	697	38.5	
Liberal Democrats	Christopher Hennessey	325	18.0	
Majority		90	5.0	
Turnout		1,809	31.9	+2.4
Labour hold		Swing		

Central
Party	Candidate	Votes	%	±%
Labour	Debbie Taylor	832	49.4	
Conservative	Paul Swansborough	606	36.0	
Liberal Democrats	Adam Isherwood	247	14.7	
Majority		226	13.4	
Turnout		1,685	39.5	+0.9
Labour hold		Swing		

Church Hill
Party	Candidate	Votes	%	±%
Labour	David Hunt	865	45.1	
Conservative	Jason Allbutt	626	32.6	
Liberal Democrats	David Gee	428	22.3	
Majority		239	12.5	
Turnout		1,919	32.0	−1.2
Labour hold		Swing		

Crabbs Cross
Party	Candidate	Votes	%	±%
Conservative	David Smith	1,014	61.6	
Labour	Richard Timney	344	20.9	
Liberal Democrats	Kathleen Cummings	288	17.5	
Majority		670	40.7	
Turnout		1,646	37.9	+0.6
Conservative hold		Swing		

Greenlands
Party	Candidate	Votes	%	±%
Labour	Phiip Mould	822	45.9	
Conservative	Kathleen Banks	605	33.8	
Liberal Democrats	Anthony Pitt	365	20.4	
Majority		217	12.1	
Turnout		1,792	30.1	+1.1
Labour hold		Swing		

Headless Cross & Oakenshaw
Party	Candidate	Votes	%	±%
Conservative	Keith Boyd-Carpenter	1,276	52.0	
Liberal Democrats	Michael Ashall	682	27.8	
Labour	John Fisher	494	20.1	
Majority		594	24.2	
Turnout		2,452	36.7	0.0
Conservative hold		Swing		

Lodge Park
Party	Candidate	Votes	%	±%
Labour	Andrew Fry	570	46.3	
Conservative	Gordon Craig	437	35.5	
Liberal Democrats	Ian Webster	225	18.3	
Majority		133	10.8	
Turnout		1,232	34.1	−1.3
Labour hold		Swing		

Winyates
Party	Candidate	Votes	%	±%
BNP	David Enderby	890	31.4	
Labour	Albert Wharrad	878	31.0	
Conservative	Anita Clayton	613	21.6	
Liberal Democrats	Karen Weston	454	16.0	
Majority		12	0.4	
Turnout		2,835	44.0	+7.9
BNP gain from Labour		Swing		
