= 2010 Redditch Borough Council election =

2010 UK local government election

Map of the results

The 2010 Redditch Borough Council election was held on 6 May 2010 to elect members of Redditch Borough Council in Worcestershire, England. A total of eleven council seats were up for election: six Conservative, four Labour and one British National Party. The death of Conservative Cllr. Jack Field on 10 March triggered a by-election in the Crabbs Cross ward. No Liberal Democrat councillors defended seats.

Before the election the council was made up of:

- 15 Conservative councillors
- 10 Labour councillors
- 3 Liberal Democrat councillors
- 1 British National councillor

== Election results ==
Redditch local election result 2010
Party	Seats	Gains	Losses	Net gain/loss	Seats %	Votes %	Votes	+/−
Conservative	17	2	0	+2	58.62	41.28	14,915	+7,100
Labour	9	0	1	-1	31.03	30.16	10,880	+5,999
Liberal Democrats	3	0	0	0	10.34	22.30	8,056	+5,853
Green	0	0	0	0	0	3.80	1,374	+1,374
BNP	0	0	1	-1	0	1.49	539	-10
Independent	0	0	0	0	0	0.56	201	-507
English Democrat	0	0	0	0	0	0.37	162	+162

== Seats up for election ==
Ward	Party	Incumbent Elected	Incumbent	Stood?
Abbey	Conservative	2006	Colin MacMillan	No
Astwood Bank & Feckenham	Conservative	2006	Michael Chalk	Yes
Batchley & Brockhill	Conservative	2008	Brenda Quinney	Yes
Central	Labour	2006	Debbie Taylor	Yes
Church Hill	Labour	2006	David Hunt	Yes
Crabbs Cross (includes the village of Callow Hill)	Conservative	2006	David Smith	No
Crabbs Cross (includes the village of Callow Hill)	Conservative	2007	Jack Field (deceased)	No
Greenlands	Labour	2006	Philip Mould	No
Headless Cross & Oakenshaw	Conservative	2009	Gay Hopkins	Yes
Lodge Park	Labour	2006	Andrew Fry	Yes
Winyates	British National	2006	David Enderby	Yes

== Ward results ==
=== Abbey Ward ===
Abbey
Party	Candidate	Votes	%	±%
Conservative	Simon Chalk	1,015		
Labour	Alan Mason	881		
Liberal Democrats	Simon Oliver	672		
English Democrat	Scott Preston	162		
Green	Lisa Kite	82		
Majority		134		
Turnout		2,812	64.7%	
Conservative hold		Swing		

=== Astwood Bank & Feckenham Ward ===
Astwood Bank & Feckenham
Party	Candidate	Votes	%	±%
Conservative	Michael Chalk	1,871		
Labour	Neal Stote	802		
Liberal Democrats	Christopher Hennessey	654		
Green	Joshua Harvey	151		
Majority		1,069		
Turnout		3,478	74%	
Conservative hold		Swing		

=== Batchley & Brockhill Ward ===
Batchley & Brockhill
Party	Candidate	Votes	%	±%
Conservative	Brenda Quinney	1,361		
Labour	Pattie Hill	1,335		
Liberal Democrats	Fiona Hennessey	597		
Green	Loretta Griffin	160		
Majority		26		
Turnout		3,453	59%	
Conservative hold		Swing		

=== Central Ward ===
Central
Party	Candidate	Votes	%	±%
Labour	Debbie Taylor	1,112		
Conservative	Roger Bennett	975		
Liberal Democrats	Mo Farooqui	565		
Green	Bryn Colvin	110		
Independent	Orion Moon	78		
Majority		137		
Turnout		2,840	59.7%	
Labour hold		Swing		

=== Church Hill Ward ===
Church Hill
Party	Candidate	Votes	%	±%
Conservative	Roger Hill	1,301		
Labour	David Hunt	1,282		
Liberal Democrats	David Gee	788		
Independent	Pamela Forsyth	123		
Green	Lee Bradley	93		
Majority		19		
Turnout		3,587	58%	
Conservative gain from Labour		Swing		

=== Crabbs Cross Ward ===
Crabbs Cross (2)
Party	Candidate	Votes	%	±%
Conservative	Derek Taylor	1,553		
Conservative	Andrew Brazier	1,506		
Labour	Philip Bowes	706		
Liberal Democrats	Edward Kilworth	696		
Liberal Democrats	Adam Isherwood	641		
Labour	John Fisher	568		
Green	Yvonne Rhodes	189		
Majority		800		
Turnout		5,859	70%	
Conservative hold		Swing		
Conservative hold		Swing		

=== Greenlands Ward ===
Greenlands
Party	Candidate	Votes	%	±%
Labour	Graham Vickery	1,358		
Conservative	Taff Davies	1,235		
Liberal Democrats	Anthony Pitt	778		
Green	Rylma White	155		
Majority		123		
Turnout		3,526	55.8%	
Labour hold		Swing		

=== Headless Cross & Oakenshaw Ward ===
Headless Cross & Oakenshaw
Party	Candidate	Votes	%	±%
Conservative	Gay Hopkins	2,094		
Labour	Yvonne Smith	1,294		
Liberal Democrats	John Stanley	1,008		
Green	Alistair Waugh	228		
Majority		800		
Turnout		4,624	67.4%	
Conservative hold		Swing		

=== Lodge Park Ward ===
Lodge Park
Party	Candidate	Votes	%	±%
Labour	Andrew Fry	1,135		
Conservative	David Bush	749		
Liberal Democrats	Ian Webster	434		
Green	Kevin White	107		
Majority		386		
Turnout		2,425	60.1%	
Labour hold		Swing		

=== Winyates Ward ===
Winyates
Party	Candidate	Votes	%	±%
Conservative	Adam Griffin	1,255		
Liberal Democrats	Stephen Walker	1,223		
Labour	Clive Cheetham	1,113		
BNP	David Enderby	539		
Green	Emma Bradley	99		
Majority		32		
Turnout		4,229	64.3%	
Conservative gain from BNP		Swing		
