= Redditch Borough Council =

Local authority in Worcestershire, England

Leadership
- Mayor: Susan Eacock, Reform UK since 26 May 2026
- Leader: Matt Dormer, Conservative Party since 26 May 2026
- Chief Executive: John Leach since 2025

Structure
- Seats: 27 seats
- Graph of the party split among 27 seats.
- Political groups: Administration (7) Conservative (4) Independent (3) Confidence and supply (7) Reform (7) Opposition (13) Labour (13)

Elections
- Last election: 7 May 2026

Motto
- REDDITE DEO (Render to God/Redditch for God)

Meeting place
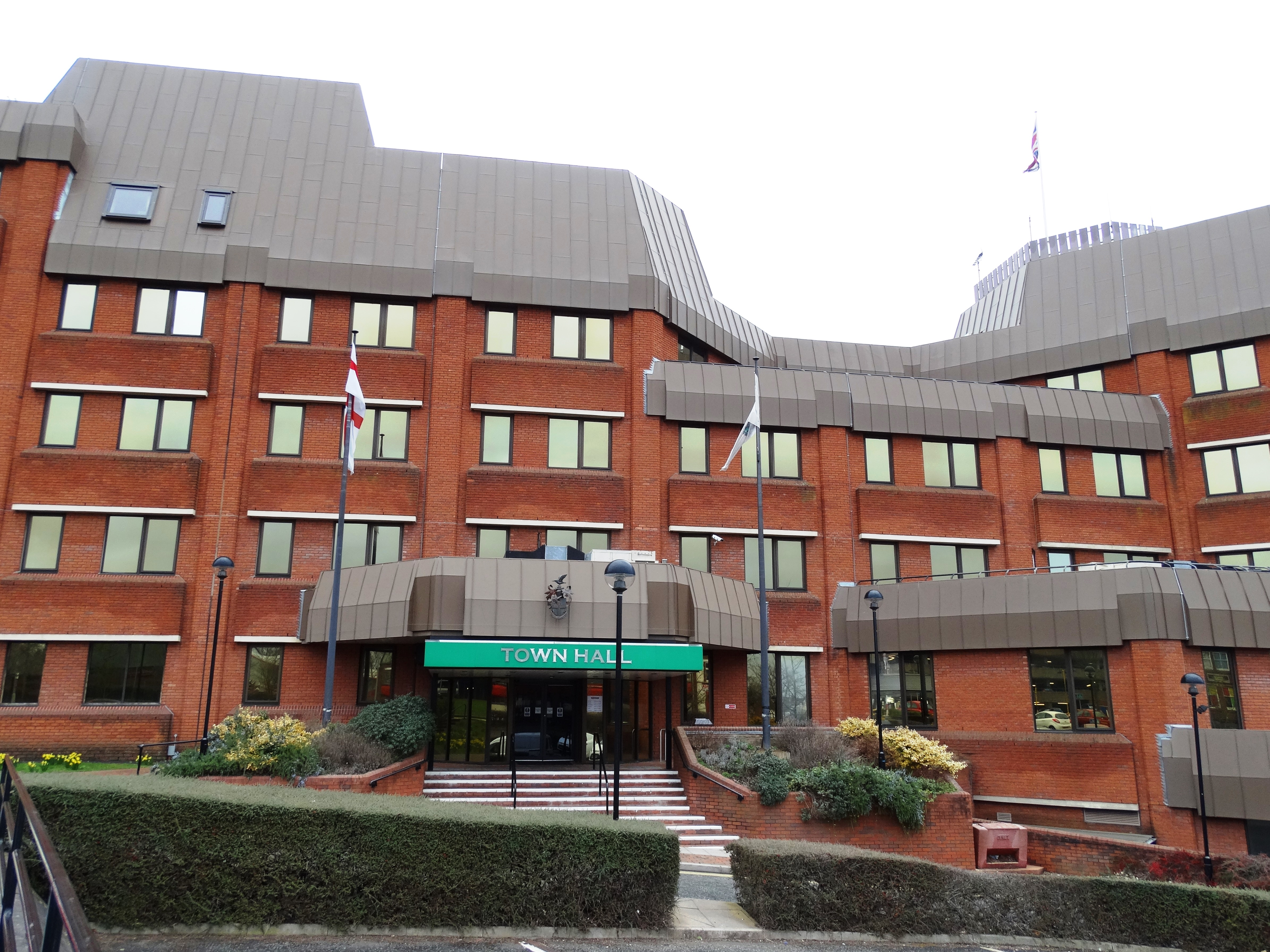
- Town Hall, Walter Stranz Square, Redditch, B98 8AH

Website
- www.redditchbc.gov.uk

Redditch Borough Council is the local authority for Redditch, a non-metropolitan district with borough status in Worcestershire, England. The council is based at Redditch Town Hall.

The council went under no overall control at the May 2026 election, since when the council has been run by a Conservative-led administration with the support of a confidence and supply agreement with Reform UK.

The borough council is due to be abolished in 2028 as part of upcoming structural changes to local government in England.

== History ==
The town of Redditch was made a local government district in 1858, governed by a local board. Such districts were renamed urban districts in 1894. The urban district in turn was abolished in 1974 and replaced by a non-metropolitan district covering the same area as the former urban district, but with different powers and responsibilities.

Redditch district was awarded borough status on 15 May 1980, changing the council's name to Redditch Borough Council and allowing the chair of the council to take the title of mayor.

In 2026, the government announced plans to abolish the borough with effect from April 2028, with the borough council's functions passing to a new unitary authority for North Worcestershire.

== Governance ==
Redditch Borough Council provides district-level services. County-level services are provided by Worcestershire County Council. Feckenham is a civil parish, which forms a third tier of local government for that part of the borough; the rest of the borough is an unparished area.

Since 2008, the council has developed shared working arrangements with neighbouring Bromsgrove District Council, with the two organisations sharing a chief executive, management team and other staff.

== Political control ==
The council went under no overall control at the 2026 election. Labour was the largest party after that election, but an administration comprising the Conservatives and independent councillors took control of the council instead, led by Conservative councillor Matt Dormer. The new administration was supported by Reform UK on a confidence and supply basis.

Political control of the council since the 1974 reforms has been as follows:

Party in control	Years
Labour	1974–1976
Conservative	1976–1983
Labour	1983–2002
No overall control	2002–2004
Labour	2004–2006
No overall control	2006–2008
Conservative	2008–2012
Labour	2012–2018
Conservative	2018–2024
Labour	2024–2026
No overall control	2026–present

=== Leadership ===
The role of mayor is largely ceremonial in Redditch. Political leadership is instead provided by the leader of the council. The leaders since 2008 have been:

Councillor	Party	From	To
Carole Gandy	Conservative	May 2008	21 May 2012
Bill Hartnett	Labour	21 May 2012	21 May 2018
Matthew Dormer	Conservative	21 May 2018	20 May 2024
Joe Baker	Labour	20 May 2024	11 April 2025
Sharon Harvey	Labour	19 May 2025	26 May 2026
Matthew Dormer	Conservative	26 May 2026	

=== Composition ===
Following the 2026 election, and subsequent changes of allegiance up to June 2026 the composition of the council was:

Party	Councillors
Labour	13
Reform	7
Conservative	4
Independent	3
Total	27

== Premises ==
The council is based at Redditch Town Hall on Walter Stranz Square. The foundation stone was laid in 1981. It cost £7.5 million to build and it was opened in 1982.

== Elections ==
Since the last boundary changes in 2024, the council has comprised 27 councillors representing 9 wards, with each ward electing three councillors. Elections are held three years out of every four, with a third of the council elected each time for a four-year term of office. Worcestershire County Council elections are held in the fourth year of the cycle when there are no borough council elections.
