= John Soane =

English architect (1753–1837)

Sir John Soane RA FSA FRS
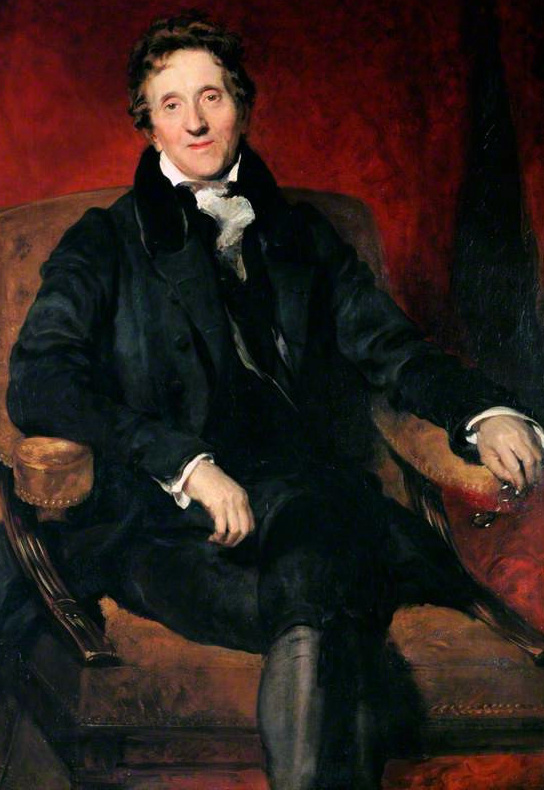
- Portrait of John Soane by Thomas Lawrence, 1829
- Born: John Soan; 10 September 1753; Goring-on-Thames, Oxfordshire, England
- Died: 20 January 1837 (aged 83); 13 Lincoln's Inn Fields, London, England
- Occupation: Architect
- Spouse: Elizabeth Smith (m. 1784; died 1815)
- Children: 4
- Buildings: Bank of England; Dulwich Picture Gallery; Pitzhanger Manor; 12–14 Lincoln's Inn Fields (now Sir John Soane's Museum)

Sir John Soane (/soʊn/; né Soan; 10 September 1753 – 20 January 1837) was an English architect who specialised in the Neo-Classical style. The son of a bricklayer, he rose to the top of his profession, becoming professor of architecture at the Royal Academy and an official architect to the Office of Works. He received a knighthood in 1831.

Soane's best-known work was the Bank of England (his work there is largely destroyed), a building which had a widespread effect on commercial architecture. He also designed Dulwich Picture Gallery, which, with its top-lit galleries, was a major influence on the planning of subsequent art galleries and museums.

His main legacy is Sir John Soane's Museum in Lincoln's Inn Fields in his former home and office, designed to display the art works and architectural artefacts that he collected during his lifetime. The museum is described in the Oxford Dictionary of Architecture as "one of the most complex, intricate, and ingenious series of interiors ever conceived".

== Background and training ==
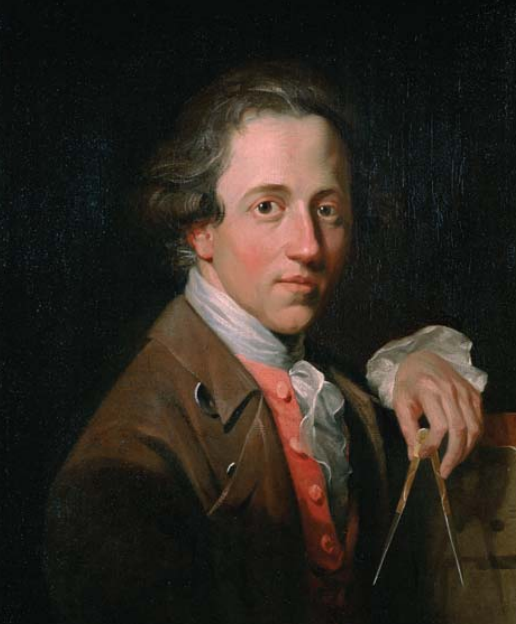
John Soane by Christopher William Hunneman in 1776

Soane was born in Goring-on-Thames on 10 September 1753. He was the second surviving son of John Soan and his wife Martha. The 'e' was added to the surname by the architect in 1784 on his marriage. His father was a builder or bricklayer, and died when Soane was fourteen in April 1768. He was educated in nearby Reading in a private school run by William Baker. After his father's death Soane's family moved to nearby Chertsey to live with Soane's brother William, 12 years his elder.

William Soan introduced his brother to James Peacock, a surveyor who worked with George Dance the Younger. Soane began his training as an architect age 15 under George Dance the Younger and joined the architect at his home and office in the City of London at the corner of Moorfields and Chiswell Street. Dance was a founding member of the Royal Academy and doubtless encouraged Soane to join the schools there on 25 October 1771 as they were free. There he would have attended the architecture lectures delivered by Thomas Sandby and the lectures on perspective delivered by Samuel Wale.

Dance's growing family was probably the reason that in 1772 Soane continued his education by joining the household and office of Henry Holland. He recalled later that he was "placed in the office of an eminent builder in extensive practice where I had every opportunity of surveying the progress of building in all its different varieties, and of attaining the knowledge of measuring and valuing artificers' work". During his studies at the Royal Academy, he was awarded the academy's silver medal on 10 December 1772 for a measured drawing of the façade of the Banqueting House, Whitehall, which was followed by the gold medal on 10 December 1776 for his design of a Triumphal Bridge. He received a travelling scholarship in December 1777 and exhibited at the Royal Academy a design for a mausoleum for his friend and fellow student James King, who had drowned in 1776 on a boating trip to Greenwich. Soane, a non-swimmer, was going to be with the party but decided to stay home and work on his design for a Triumphal Bridge. By 1777, Soane was living in his own accommodation in Hamilton Street. In 1778 he published his first book, Designs in Architecture. He sought advice from Sir William Chambers on what to study: "Always see with your own eyes ... [you] must discover their true beauties, and the secrets by which they are produced." Using his travelling scholarship of £60 per annum for three years, plus an additional £30 travelling expenses for each leg of the journey, Soane set sail on his Grand Tour, his ultimate destination being Rome, at 5:00 am, 18 March 1778.

== Grand Tour ==
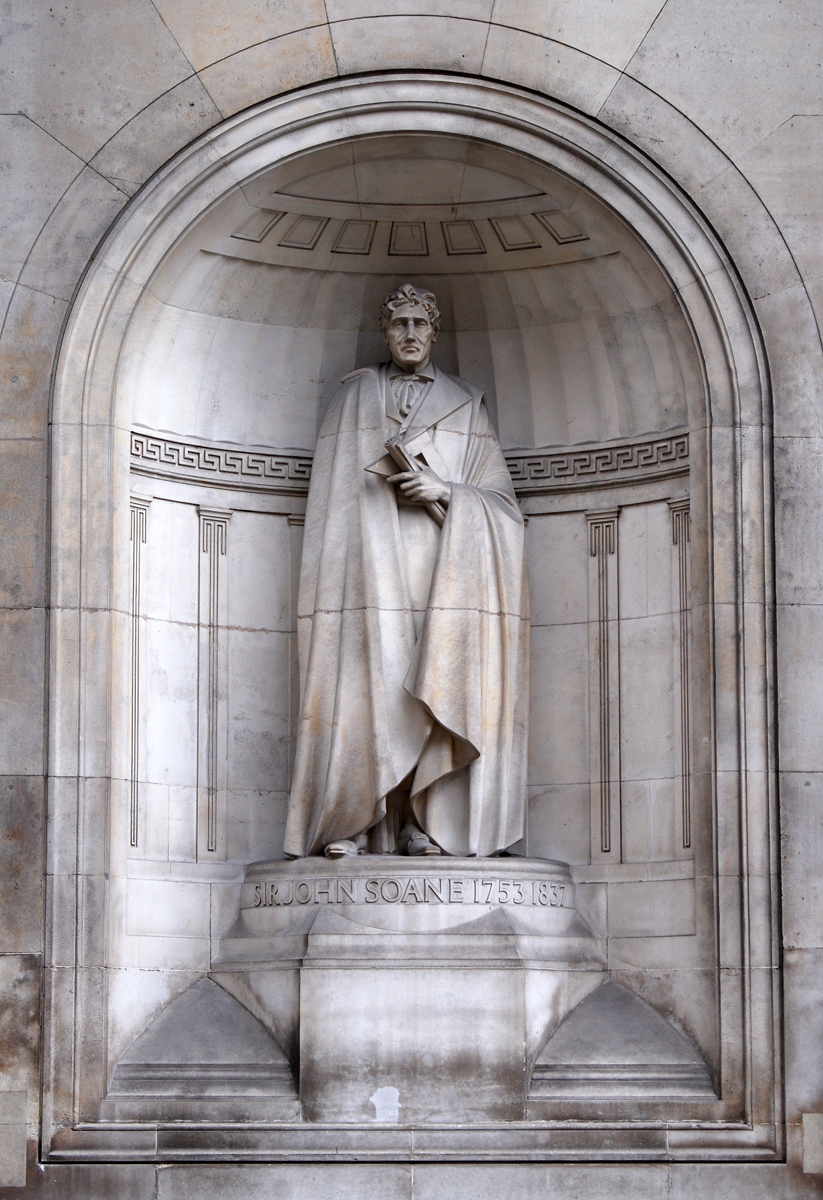
Statue of Sir John Soane at the Bank of England, London

His travelling companion was Robert Furze Brettingham; they travelled via Paris, where they visited Jean-Rodolphe Perronet, and then went on to the Palace of Versailles on 29 March. They finally reached Rome on 2 May 1778. Soane wrote home, "my attention is entirely taken up in the seeing and examining the numerous and inestimable remains of Antiquity ...". His first dated drawing is 21 May of the church of Sant'Agnese fuori le mura (Saint Agnes Outside the Walls). His former classmate, the architect Thomas Hardwick, returned to Rome in June from Naples. Hardwick and Soane would produce a series of measured drawings and ground plans of Roman buildings together. During the summer they visited Hadrian's Villa and the Temple of Vesta, Tivoli, while back in Rome they investigated the Colosseum. In August Soane was working on a design for a British Senate House to be submitted for the 1779 Royal Academy summer exhibition.

In the autumn he met the Bishop of Derry, Frederick Hervey, 4th Earl of Bristol, who had built several grand properties for himself. The Earl presented copies of I quattro libri dell'architettura and De architectura to Soane. In December the Earl introduced Soane to Thomas Pitt, 1st Baron Camelford, an acquaintance which would lead eventually to architectural commissions. The Earl persuaded Soane to accompany him to Naples, setting off from Rome on 22 December 1778. On the way they visited Capua and the Palace of Caserta, arriving in Naples on 29 December. It was there that Soane met two future clients, John Patteson and Richard Bosanquet. From Naples Soane made several excursions including to Pozzuoli, Cumae and Pompeii, where he met yet another future client, Philip Yorke. Soane also attended a performance at Teatro di San Carlo and climbed Mount Vesuvius. Visiting Paestum, Soane was deeply impressed by the Greek temples. Next he visited the Certosa di Padula, then went on to Eboli and Salerno and its cathedral. Later they visited Benevento and Herculaneum. The Earl and Soane left for Rome on 12 March 1779, travelling via Capua, Gaeta, the Pontine Marshes, Velletri, the Alban Hills and Lake Albano, and Castel Gandolfo. Back in Rome they visited the Palazzo Barberini and witnessed the celebrations of Holy Week. Shortly after, the Earl and his family departed for home, followed a few weeks later by Thomas Hardwick.

It was then that Soane met Maria Hadfield (they became lifelong friends) and Thomas Banks. Soane was now fairly fluent in the Italian language, a sign of his growing confidence. A party, including Thomas Bowdler, Rowland Burdon, John Patteson, John Stuart and Henry Grewold Lewis, decided to visit Sicily and paid for Soane to accompany them as a draughtsman. The party headed for Naples on 11 April, where on 21 April they caught a Swedish ship to Palermo. Soane visited the Villa Palagonia, which made a deep impact on him. Influenced by the account of the Villa in his copy of Patrick Brydone's Tour through Sicily and Malta, Soane savoured the "Prince of Palagonia's Monsters ... nothing more than the most extravagant caricatures in stone", but more significantly seems to have been inspired by the Hall of Mirrors to introduce similar effects when he came to design the interiors of his own house in Lincoln's Inn Fields. Leaving Palermo from where the party split, Stuart and Bowdler going off together. The rest headed for Segesta, Trapani, Selinunte and Agrigento, exposing Soane to Ancient Greek architecture. From Agrigento the party headed for Licata, where they sailed for Malta and Valletta returning on 2 June, to Syracuse, Sicily. Moving on to Catania and Palazzo Biscari then Mount Etna, Taormina, Messina and the Lepari Islands. They were back in Naples by 2 July where Soane purchased books and prints, visiting Sorrento before returning to Rome. Shortly after, John Patterson returned to England via Vienna, from where he sent Soane the first six volumes of The Life and Opinions of Tristram Shandy, Gentleman, delivered by Antonio Salieri.

In Rome Soane's circle now included Henry Tresham, Thomas Jones and Nathaniel Marchant. Soane continued to study the buildings of Rome, including the Basilica of St. John Lateran. Soane and Rowland Burdon set out in August for Lombardy. Their journey included visits to Ancona, Rimini, Bologna, Parma and its Accademia, Milan, Verona, Vicenza and its buildings by Andrea Palladio, Padua, the Brenta (river) with its villas by Palladio, Venice. Then back to Bologna where Soane copied designs for completing the west front of San Petronio Basilica including ones by Palladio, Giacomo Barozzi da Vignola and Baldassare Peruzzi. Then to Florence and the Accademia delle Arti del Disegno of which he was later, in January 1780 elected a member; then returned to Rome.

Soane continued his study of buildings, including Villa Lante, Palazzo Farnese, Palazzo Massimo alle Colonne, the Capitoline Museums and the Villa Albani. That autumn he met Henry Bankes. Soane prepared plans for the Banke's house Kingston Lacy, but these came to nothing. Early in 1780 Frederick Augustus Hervey, 4th Earl of Bristol wrote to Soane offering him various architectural commissions. Soane decided to return to England and began to organise his return journey. He left Rome on 19 April 1780, travelling with the Reverend George Holgate and his pupil Michael Pepper. They visited the Villa Farnese, then on to Siena. Then Florence where they visited the Palazzo Pitti, Uffizi, Santo Spirito, Giotto's Campanile and other sites.

Performing at the Teatro della Pergola was Nancy Storace with whom Soane formed a lifelong friendship. Their journey continued on via Bologna, Padua, Vicenza, Verona, Mantua where he sketched Palazzo del Te, Parma, Piacenza. In Milan he attended La Scala – the theatre was a growing interest – and from Lake Como they began their crossing of the Alps via the Splügen Pass. They then passed on to Zürich, Reichenau, Wettingen, Schaffhausen, Basel on the way to which the bottom of Soane's trunk came loose on the coach and spilled the contents behind it. He thus lost many of his books, drawings, drawing instruments, clothes and his gold and silver medals from the Royal Academy (none of which was recovered). He continued his journey on to Freiburg im Breisgau, Cologne, Liège, Leuven and Brussels before embarking for England.

== Early projects ==
=== Struggle to establish architectural practice ===
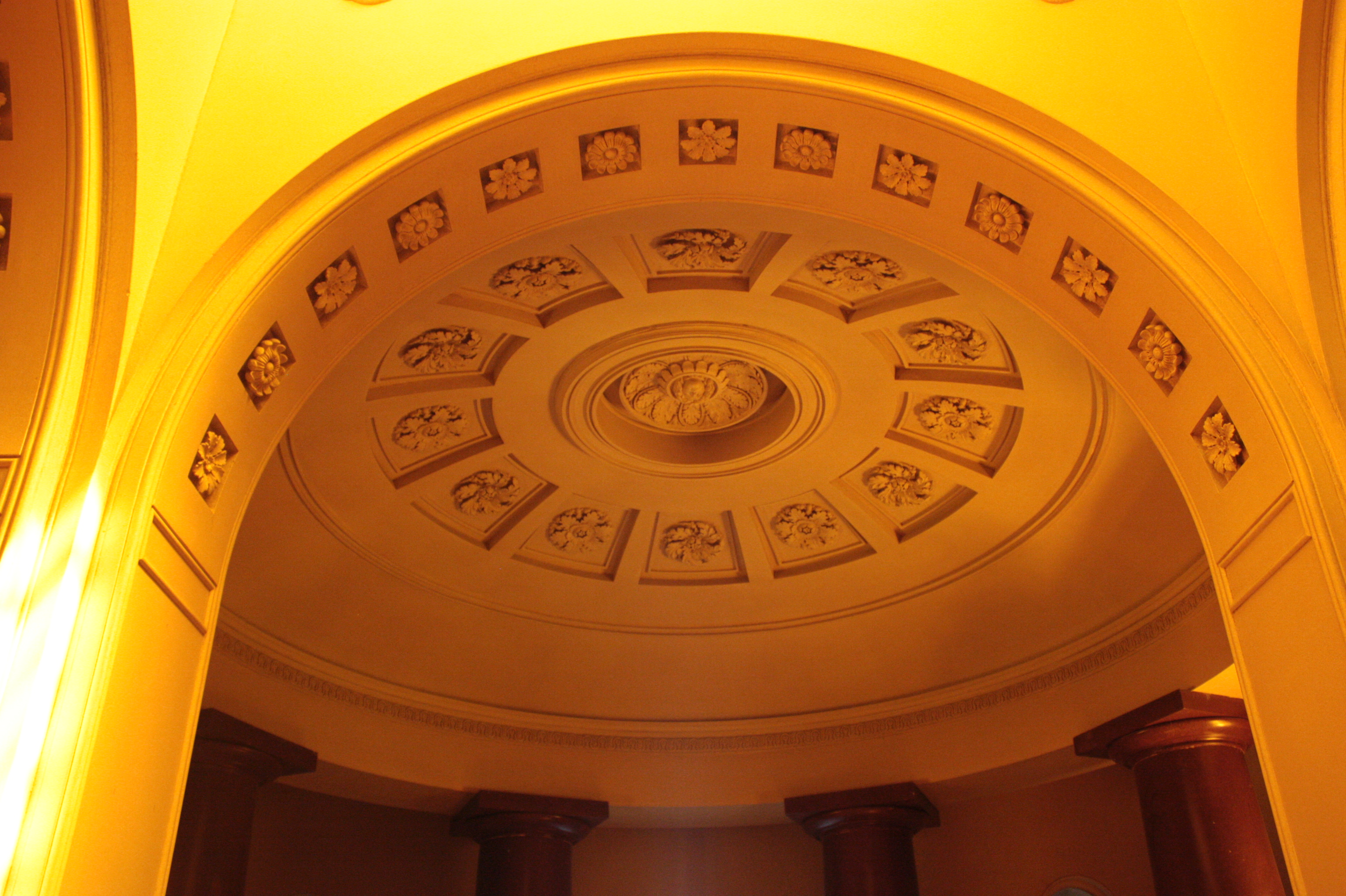
Ceiling in the Bourgeois Mausoleum, Dulwich House (Dulwich Picture Gallery)

He reached England in June 1780; thanks to his Grand Tour he was £120 in debt. After a brief stop in London, Soane headed for Frederick Augustus Hervey, 4th Earl of Bristol's estate at Ickworth House in Suffolk, where the Earl was planning to build a new house. But immediately the Earl changed his mind and dispatched Soane to Downhill House, in County Londonderry, Ireland, where Soane arrived on 27 July 1780. The Earl had grandiose plans to rebuild the house, but Soane and the Earl disagreed over the design and parted company, Soane receiving only £30 for his efforts. He left via Belfast sailing to Glasgow. From Glasgow he travelled to Allanbank, Scottish Borders, home of a family by the name of Stuart he had met in Rome, and prepared plans for a new mansion for the family, but again the commission came to nothing. In early December 1780 Soane took lodgings at 10 Cavendish Street, London. To pay his way his friends from the Grand Tour, Thomas Pitt and Philip Yorke, gave him commissions for repairs and minor alterations. Anna, Lady Miller, considered building a temple in her garden at Batheaston to Soane's design and he hoped he might receive work from her circle of friends. But again this was not to be. To help him out, George Dance gave Soane a few measuring jobs, including one in May 1781 on his repairs to Newgate Prison of damage caused by the Gordon Riots.

To give Soane some respite, Thomas Pitt invited him to stay in 1781 at his Thamesside villa of Petersham Lodge, which Soane was commissioned to redecorate and repair. Also in 1781 Philip Yorke gave Soane commissions: at his home, Hamels Park in Hertfordshire, he designed a new entrance gate and lodges, followed by a new dairy and alterations to the house, and in London alterations and redecoration of 63 New Cavendish Street. Increasingly desperate for work Soane entered a competition in March 1782 to design a prison, but failed to win. Soane continued to get other minor design work in 1782.

== Architectural career and success ==
From the mid-1780s on Soane would receive a steady stream of commissions until his semi-retirement in 1832.

=== Early domestic works ===
It was not until 1783 that Soane received his first commission for a new country house, Letton Hall in Norfolk. The house was a fairly modest villa but it was a sign that at last Soane's career was taking off and led to other work in East Anglia: Saxlingham Rectory in 1784, Shotesham Hall in 1785, Tendring Hall in 1784–86, and the remodelling of Ryston Hall in 1787.

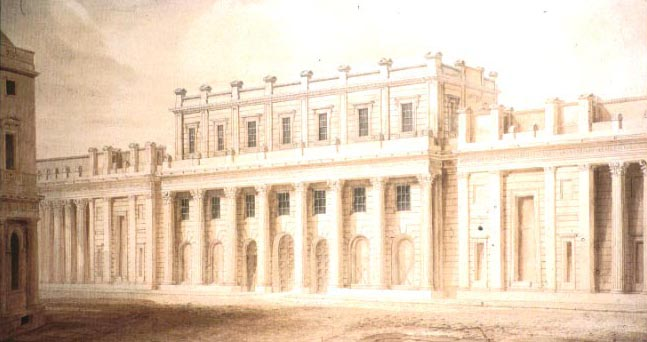
Bank of England Entrance facade, 1818–1827

At this early stage in his career Soane was dependent on domestic work, including: Piercefield House (1784), now a ruin; the remodelling of Chillington Hall (1785); The Manor, Cricket St Thomas (1786); Bentley Priory (1788); the extension of the Roman Catholic Chapel at New Wardour Castle (1788). An important commission was alterations to William Pitt the Younger's Holwood House in 1786, Soane had befriended William Pitt's uncle Thomas on his grand tour. In 1787 Soane remodelled the interior of Fonthill Splendens (later replaced by Fonthill Abbey) for Thomas Beckford, adding a picture gallery lit by two domes and other work.

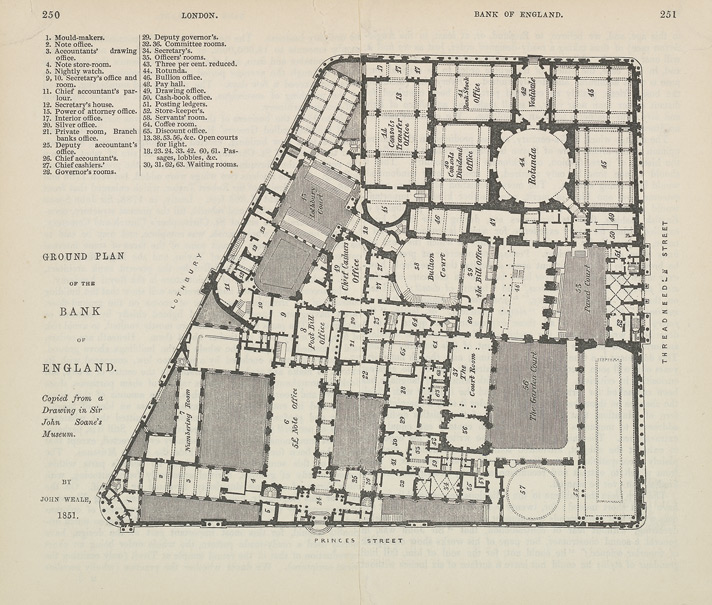
Ground plan of the Bank of England

=== Bank of England ===
On 16 October 1788 he succeeded Sir Robert Taylor as architect and surveyor to the Bank of England. He would work at the bank for the next 45 years, resigning in 1833. Given Soane's youth and relative inexperience, his appointment was down to the influence of William Pitt, who was then the Prime Minister and his friend from the Grand Tour, Richard Bosanquet whose brother was Samuel Bosanquet, Director and later Governor of the Bank of England. His salary was set at 5% of the cost of any building works at the Bank, paid every six months. Soane would virtually rebuild the entire bank, and vastly extend it. The five main banking halls were based on the same basic layout, starting with the Bank Stock Office of 1791–96, consists of a rectangular room, the centre with a large lantern light supported by piers and pendentives, then the four corners of the rectangle have low vaulted spaces, and in the centre of each side compartments rising to the height of the arches supporting the central lantern, the room is vaulted in brick and windows are iron framed to ensure the rooms are as fire proof as possible.

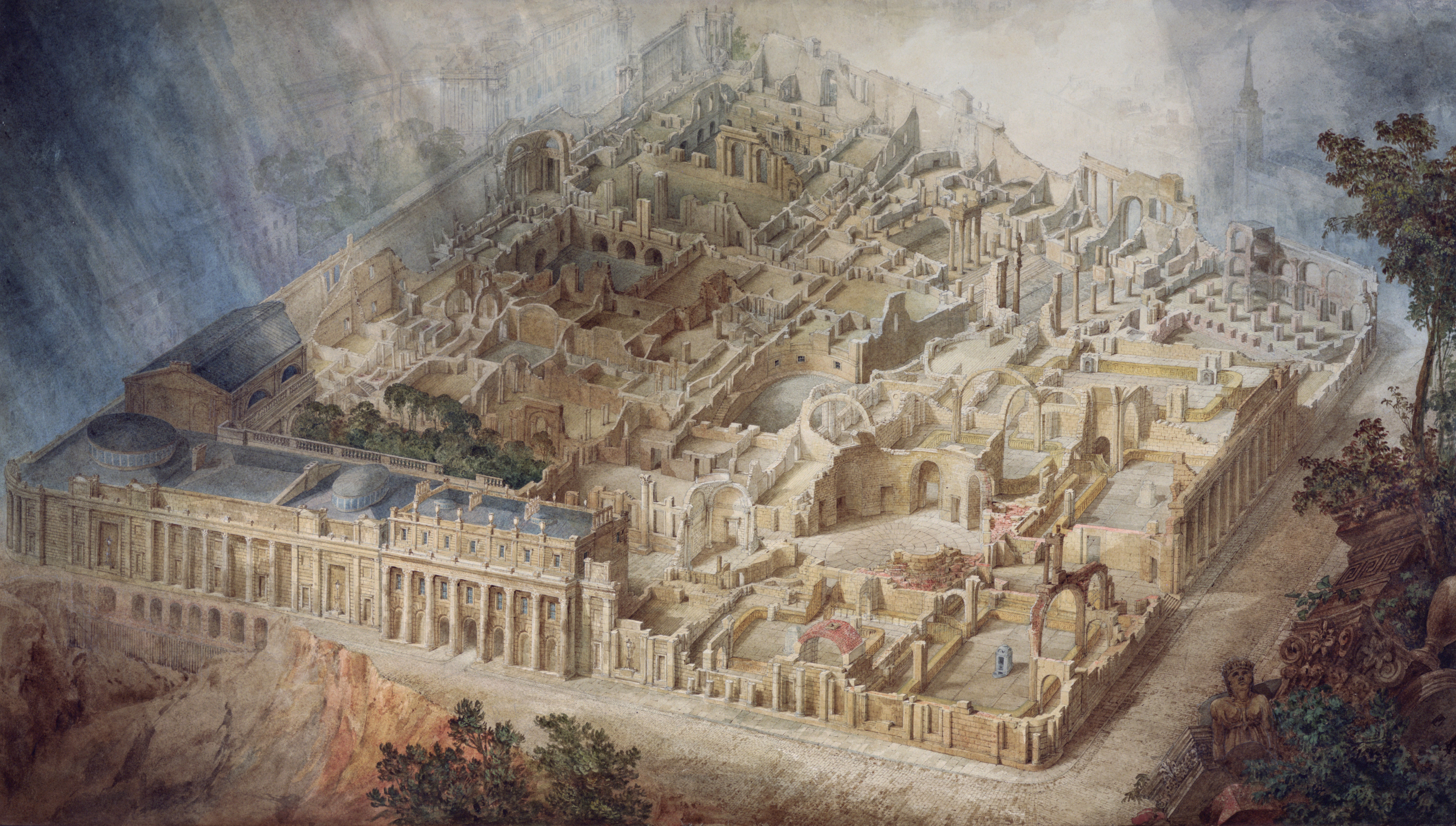
An imagined view of the Bank of England in ruins by Joseph Gandy, 1830. Sir John Soane's Museum, London.

His work at the bank was:

- Erection of Barracks for the Bank Guards and rooms for the Governor, officers and servants of the Bank (1790).
- Between 1789 and February 1791 Soane oversaw acquisition of land northwards along Princes Street.
- The erection of the outer wall along the newly acquired land (1791).
- Erection of the Bank Stock Office the first of his major interiors at the bank, with its fire proof brick vault (1791–96).
- The erection of The Four Percent Office (replacing Robert Taylor's room) (1793).
- The erection of the Rotunda (replacing Robert Taylor's rotunda) (1794).
- The erection of the Three Percent Consols Transfer Office (1797–99).
- Acquisition of more land to the north along Bartholomew Lane, Lothbury and Prince's Street (1792).
- Erection of outer wall along the north-east corner of the site, including an entrance arch for carriage (1794–98).
- Erection of houses for the Chief Accountant and his deputy (1797).
- The erection of the Lothbury Court within the new gate, leading to the inner courtyard used to receive Bullion (1797–1800).
- Extension of the Bank to the north-west, the exterior wall was extended around the junction of Lothbury and Princes Street, forming the 'Tivoli Corner' which is based on the Temple of Vesta, Tivoli that Soane had visited and much admired, halfway down Princes street he created the Doric Vestibule as a minor entrance to the building and within two new courtyards that were surrounded by the rooms he built in 1790 and new rooms including printing offices for banknotes, the £5 Note Office and new offices for the Accountants, the Bullion Office off the Lothbury Court (1800–1808).
- Rebuilding of the vestibule and entrance from Bartholmew Lane (1814–1818).
- The rebuilding of Robert Taylor's 3 Percent Consols Transfer Office and 3 Percent Consols Warrant Office and completion of the exterior wall around the south-east and south-west boundaries including the main-entrance in the centre of Threadneedle Street (1818–1827).

In 1807 Soane designed New Bank Buildings on Princes Street for the Bank, consisting of a terrace of five mercantile residences, which were then leased to prominent city firms.

The Bank being Soane's most famous work, Sir Herbert Baker's rebuilding of the Bank after demolishing most of Soane's earlier building was described by Nikolaus Pevsner as "the greatest architectural crime, in the City of London, of the twentieth century".

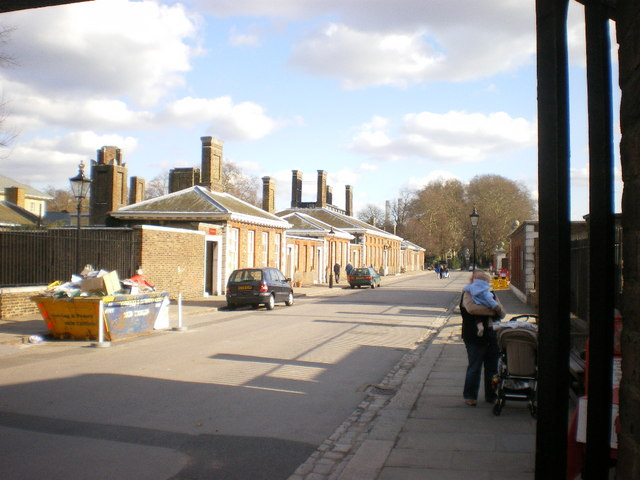
The Secretary's Offices, Royal Hospital Chelsea 1818

=== Architects' Club ===
A growing sign of Soane's success was an invitation to become a member of the Architects' Club that was formed on 20 October 1791. Practically all the leading practitioners in London were members, and it combined a meeting to discuss professional matters, at 5:00 pm on the first Thursday of every month with a dinner. The four founders were Soane's former teachers George Dance and Henry Holland with James Wyatt and Samuel Pepys Cockerell. Other original members included: Sir William Chambers, Thomas Sandby, Robert Adam, Matthew Brettingham the Younger, Thomas Hardwick and Robert Mylne. Members who later joined included Sir Robert Smirke and Sir Jeffrey Wyattville.

=== Royal Hospital Chelsea ===
On 20 January 1807 Soane was made clerk of works of Royal Hospital Chelsea. He held the post until his death thirty years later; it paid a salary of £200 per annum. His designs were: a new infirmary (built 1810; destroyed in 1941 during The Blitz), a new stable block and extension of his own official residence in 1814; a new bakehouse in 1815; a new gardener's house in 1816; a new guard-house and Secretary's Office with space for fifty staff in 1818; a Smoking Room in 1829 and finally a garden shelter in 1834.

=== Freemasons' Hall, London ===
Soane, who was a UGLE Freemason, was employed to extend Freemasons' Hall, London in 1821 by building a new gallery; later in 1826 he prepared various plans for a new hall, but it was only built in 1828–1831, including a council chamber, and smaller room next to it and a staircase leading to a kitchen and scullery in the basement. The building was demolished to make way for the current building.

=== Official appointments ===
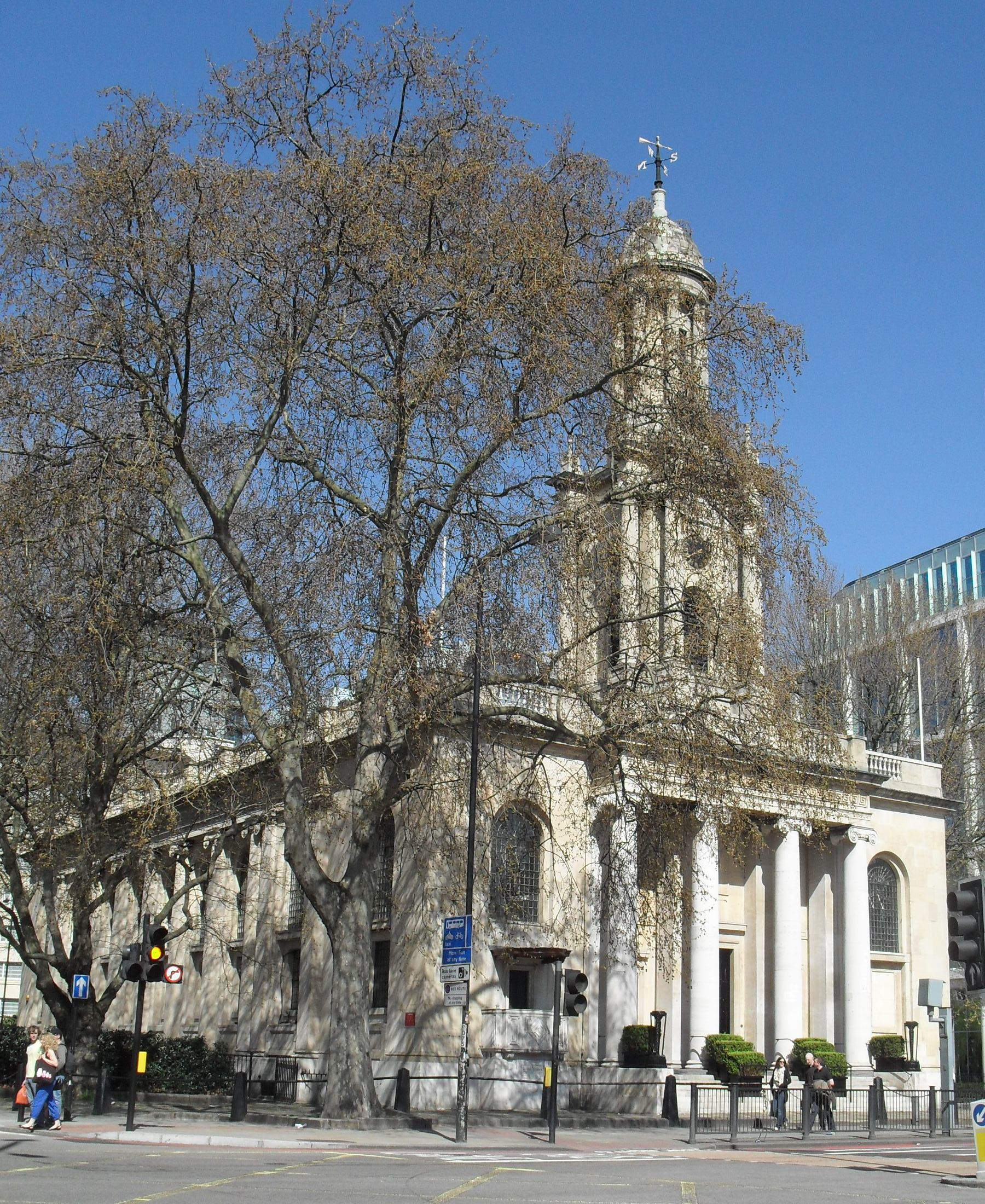
Holy Trinity Church, Marylebone 1824–6

In October 1791 Soane was appointed Clerk of Works with responsibility for St James's Palace, Whitehall and The Palace of Westminster. Between 1795 and 1799 Soane was Deputy Surveyor of His Majesty's Woods and Forest, on a salary of £200 per annum. James Wyatt's death in 1813 led to Soane together with John Nash and Robert Smirke, being appointed official architect to the Office of Works in 1813, the appointment ended in 1832, at a salary of £500 per annum. As part of this position he was invited to advise the Parliamentary Commissioners on the building of new churches from 1818 onward. He was required to produce designs for churches to seat 2000 people for £12,000 or less though Soane thought the cost too low, of the three churches he designed for the Commission all were classical in style. The three churches were: St Peter's Church, Walworth (1823–24), for £18,348; Holy Trinity Church, Marylebone (1826–27), for £24,708; St John on Bethnal Green (1826–28), for £15,999.

=== Public buildings ===
Soane designed several public buildings in London, including: National Debt Redemption Office (1817) demolished 1900; Insolvent Debtors Court (1823) demolished 1861; Privy Council and Board of Trade Offices, Whitehall (1823–24), remodelled by Sir Charles Barry, the building now houses the Cabinet Office; in a new departure for Soane he used the Italianate style for The New State Paper Office, (1829–30) demolished 1868 to make way for the Foreign and Commonwealth Office building.

His commissions in Ireland included: Dublin, Soane was commissioned by the Bank of Ireland to design a new headquarters for the triangular site on Westmoreland Street now occupied by the Westin Hotel. However, when the Irish Parliament was abolished in 1800, the Bank abandoned the project and instead bought the former Parliament Buildings. In 1808 he started work on the design of the Royal Belfast Academical Institution, for which he refused to charge. Building work began on 3 July 1810 and was completed in 1814. The remodelling of the interior has left little of Soane's work.

=== Later domestic work ===
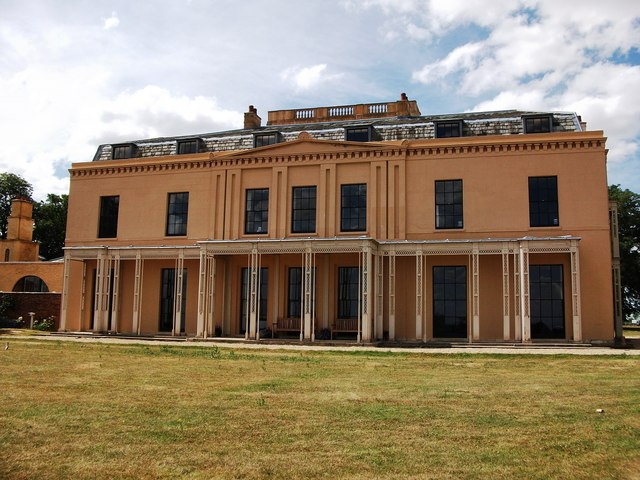
Moggerhanger House in Bedfordshire (1809)

Country homes for the landed gentry included: new rooms and remodelling of Wimpole Hall and garden buildings (1790–1794) for his friend Philip Yorke whom he met on his Grand Tour; remodelling of Baronscourt, County Tyrone, Ireland (1791); Tyringham Hall (1792–1820); and the remodelling of Aynhoe Park (1798).

In 1804, he remodelled Ramsey Abbey (none of his work there now survives); the remodelling of the south front of Port Eliot and new interiors (1804–06); the Gothic Library at Stowe House (1805–06); Moggerhanger House (1791–1809); for Marden Hill, Hertfordshire, Soane designed a new porch and entrance hall (1818); the remodelling of Wotton House after damage by fire (1820); a terrace of six houses above shops in Regent Street London (1820–21), demolished; and Pell Wall Hall (1822). Among Soane's most notable works are the dining rooms of both Numbers 10 and 11 Downing Street (1824–26) for the Prime Minister and Chancellor of the Exchequer respectively of Great Britain.

=== Dulwich Picture Gallery ===
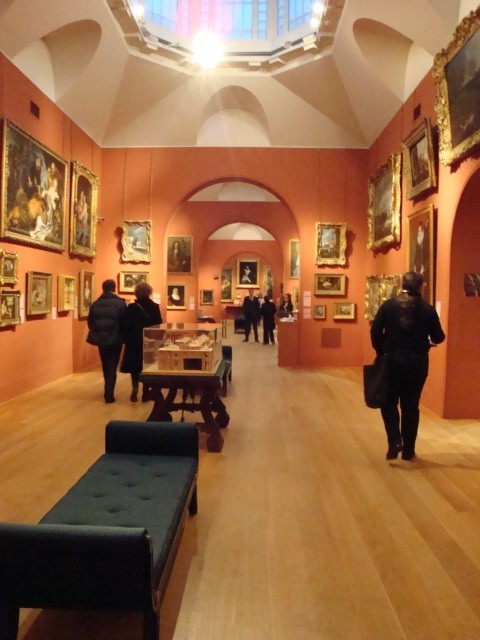
Dulwich Picture Gallery interior, 1811–1817

In 1811, Soane was appointed as architect for Dulwich Picture Gallery, the first purpose-built public art gallery in Britain, to house the Dulwich collection, which had been held by art dealers Sir Francis Bourgeois and his partner Noel Desenfans. Bourgeois's will stipulated that the Gallery should be designed by his friend John Soane to house the collection. Uniquely the building also incorporates a mausoleum containing the bodies of Francis Bourgeois, and Mr and Mrs Desenfans. The Dulwich Picture Gallery was completed in 1817. The five main galleries are lit by elongated roof lanterns.

=== New Law Courts ===
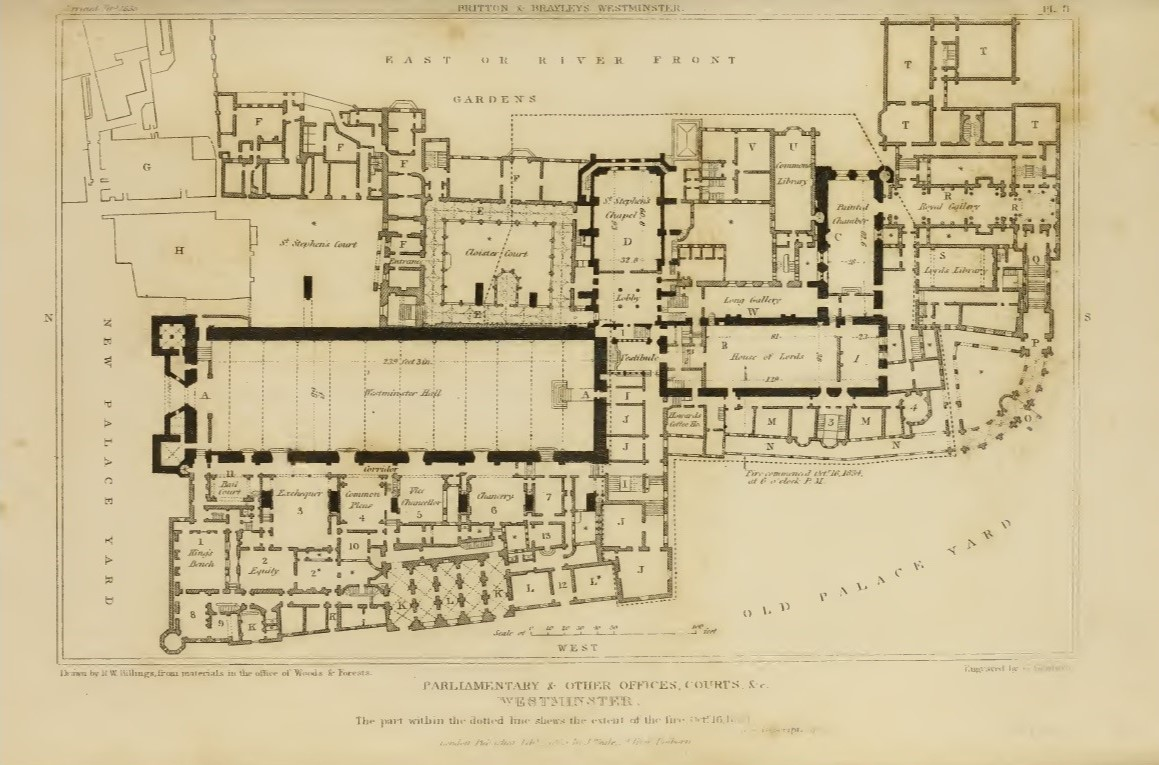
Plan of the Houses of Parliament pre 1834 fire, showing Soane's Law Courts, bottom left, also Soane's work in the House of Lords top right

As an official architect of the Office of Works Soane was asked to design the New Law Courts at Westminster Hall, he began surveying the building on 12 July 1820. Soane was to extend the law courts along the west front of Westminster Hall providing accommodation for five courts: The Court of Exchequer, Chancery, Equity, King's Bench and Common Pleas. The foundations were laid in October 1822 and the shell of the building completed by February 1824. Then Henry Bankes launched an attack on the design of the building, as a consequence Soane had to demolish the facade and set the building lines back several feet and redesign the building in a gothic style instead of the original classical design, Soane rarely designed gothic buildings. The building opened on 21 January 1825, and remained in use until the Royal Courts of Justice opened in 1882, after this the building was demolished in 1883 and the site left as lawn. All the court rooms displayed Soane's typically complex lighting arrangements, being top lit by roof lanterns often concealed from direct view.

=== Palace of Westminster ===
In 1822 as an official architect of the Office of Works, Soane was asked to make alteration to the House of Lords at the Palace of Westminster. He added a curving gothic arcade with an entrance leading to a courtyard, a new Royal Gallery, main staircase and Ante-Room. All the interiors were in a grand neo-classical style, completed by January 1824. Later he added four new committee rooms, a new library for the House of Lords and for the House of Commons alterations to the Speaker of the House of Commons house, and new library, committee rooms, clerks' rooms and stores. All were destroyed in the fire of 1834.

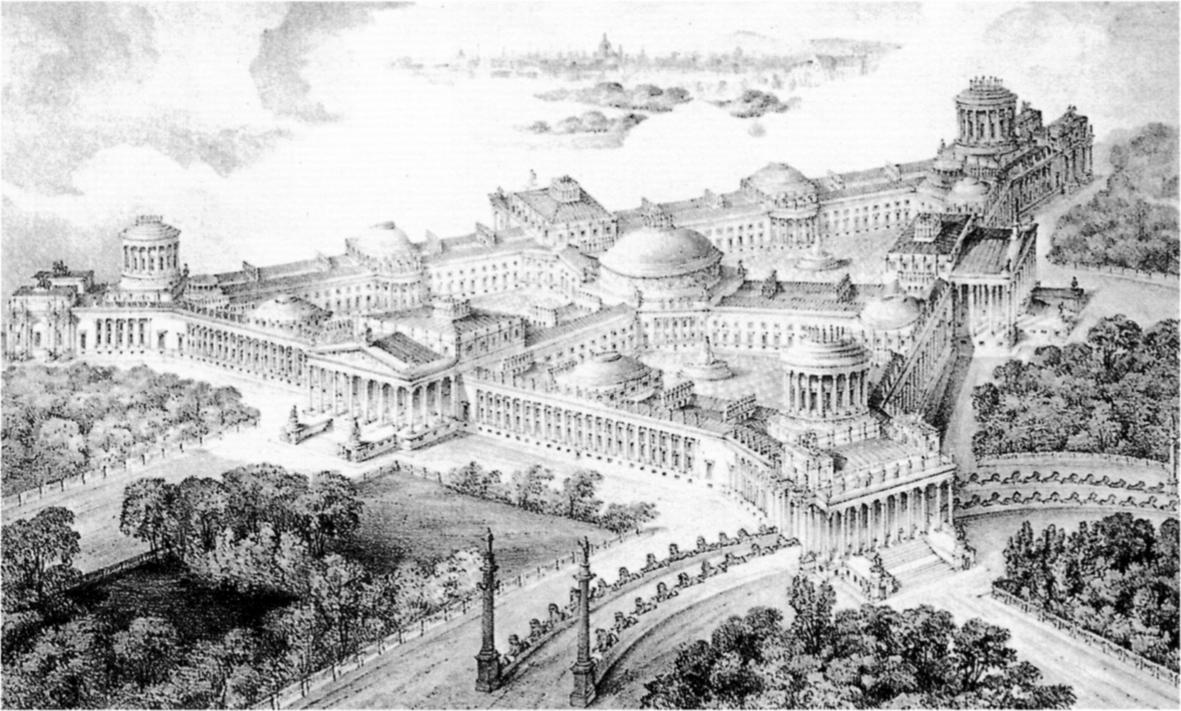
1821 Design for new Royal Palace probably on the site of Green Park London

=== Design for a Royal Palace ===
One of Soane's largest designs was for a new Royal Palace in London, a series of designs were produced c. 1820–1830. The design was unusual in that the building was triangular, there were grand porticoes at each corner and in the middle of each side of the building, the centre of the building consisted of a low dome, with ranges of rooms leading to the entrances in each side of the building, creating three internal courtyards. As far as is known it is not related to an official commission and was merely a design exercise by Soane; indeed the various drawings he produced date over several years – he first produced a design for a Royal Palace while in Rome in 1779.

== Royal Academy ==
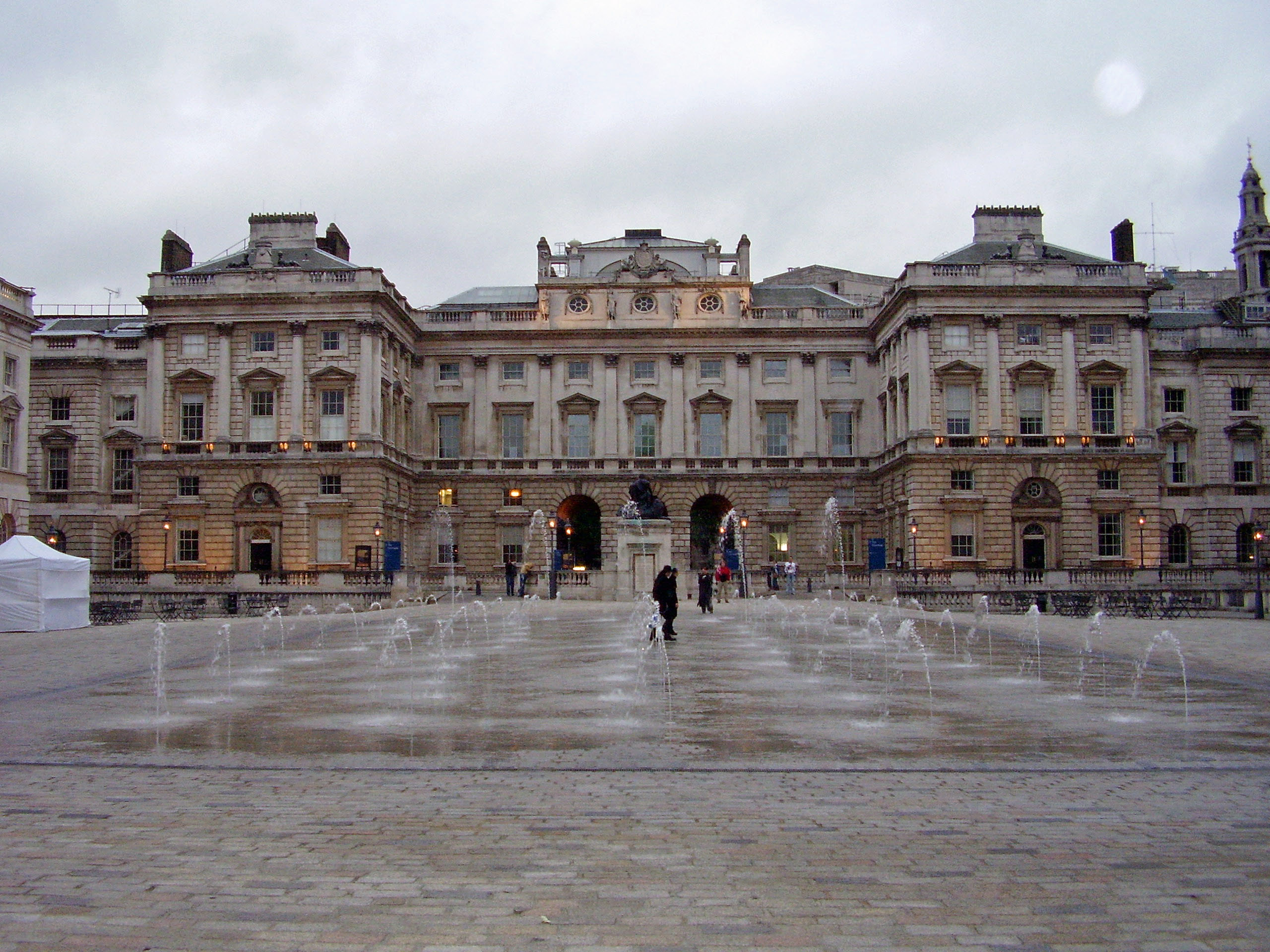
Strand Block, Somerset House, designed by William Chambers, home to the Royal Academy 1780–1837; Soane delivered all his lectures here

The Royal Academy was at the very centre of Soane's architectural career, in the sixty four years from 1772 to 1836 there were only five years, 1778 and 1788–1791, in which he did not exhibit any designs there. Soane had received part of his architectural education at the academy and it had paid for his Grand Tour. On 2 November 1795 Soane was elected an Associate Royal Academician and on 10 February 1802 Soane was elected a full Royal Academician, his diploma work being a drawing of his design for a new House of Lords. There were only ever a maximum of forty Royal Academicians at any one time. Under the rules of the Academy Soane automatically became for one year a member of the council of the academy, this consisted of the president and eight other academicians.

After Thomas Sandby died in 1798, George Dance, Soane's old teacher was appointed professor of architecture at the academy, but during his tenure of the post failed to deliver a single lecture. This caused dissatisfaction, and Soane began to manoeuver to obtain the post for himself. Eventually Soane succeeded in ousting Dance and became professor on 28 March 1806. Soane did not deliver his first lecture until 27 March 1809 and did not begin to deliver the full series of twelve lectures until January 1810. All went well until he reached his fourth lecture on 29 January 1810, in which he criticised several recent buildings in London, including George Dance's Royal College of Surgeons of England and his former pupil Robert Smirke's Covent Garden Theatre.

Royal Academicians Robert Smirke (painter) father of the architect and his friend Joseph Farington led a campaign against Soane, and as a consequence the Royal Academy introduced a rule forbidding criticism of a living British artist in any lectures delivered there. Soane attempted to resist what he saw as interference and it was only under threat of dismissal that he finally amended his lecture and recommenced on 12 February 1813 the delivery of the first six lectures. The rift that all this caused between Soane and George Dance was not healed until 1815 after the death of Mrs Soane.

The twelve lectures – they were treated as two separate courses of six lectures – were all extensively illustrated with over one thousand drawings and building plans, most of which were prepared by his pupils as part of their lessons. The lectures were:

- Lecture I – traced "architecture from its most early periods" and covered the origin of civil, military and naval architecture.
- Lecture II – outlined the Classical architecture of the ancient world continuing on from the first lecture.
- Lecture III – an analysis of the five Classical orders, their application and the use of Caryatids.
- Lecture IV – use of the classical orders structurally and decoratively and for commemorative monuments.
- Lecture V – the history of architecture from Constantine the Great and the Decline of the Roman Empire to the rise of Renaissance architecture, followed by a survey of British architecture from Inigo Jones to William Chambers (architect).
- Lecture VI – covered arches, bridges the theory and symbolism of architectural ornament.
- Lecture VII – appropriate character in architecture and the correct use of decoration.
- Lecture VIII – the distribution and planning of rooms and staircases.
- Lecture IX – the design of windows, doors, pilasters, roofs and chimney-shafts.
- Lecture X – landscape architecture and garden buildings.
- Lecture XI – a discussion of the architecture and planning of London contrasting it with Paris.
- Lecture XII – a discussion of construction methods and standards.

== Soane's library ==
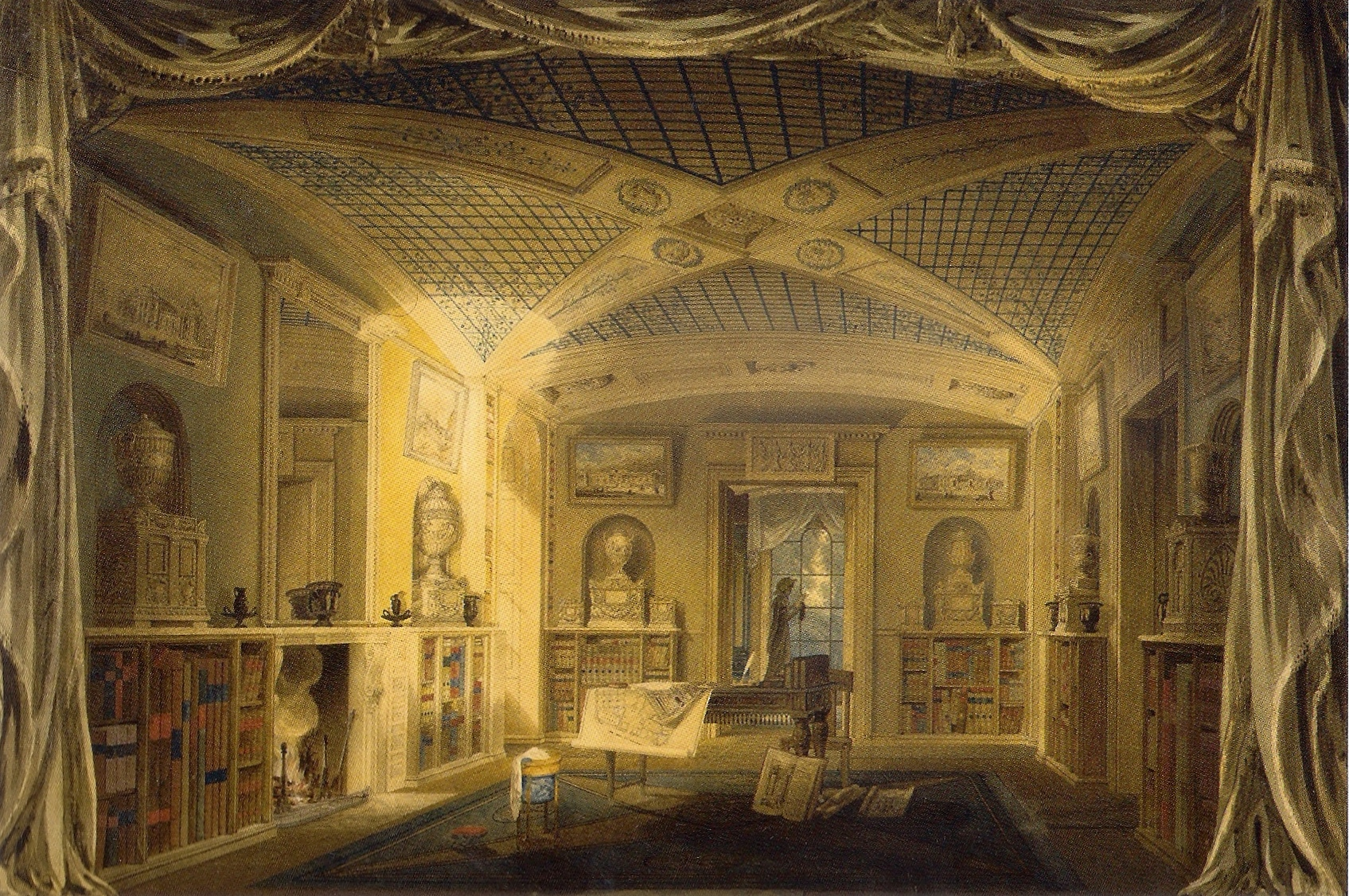
Soane's Library at Pitzhanger Manor c. 1802

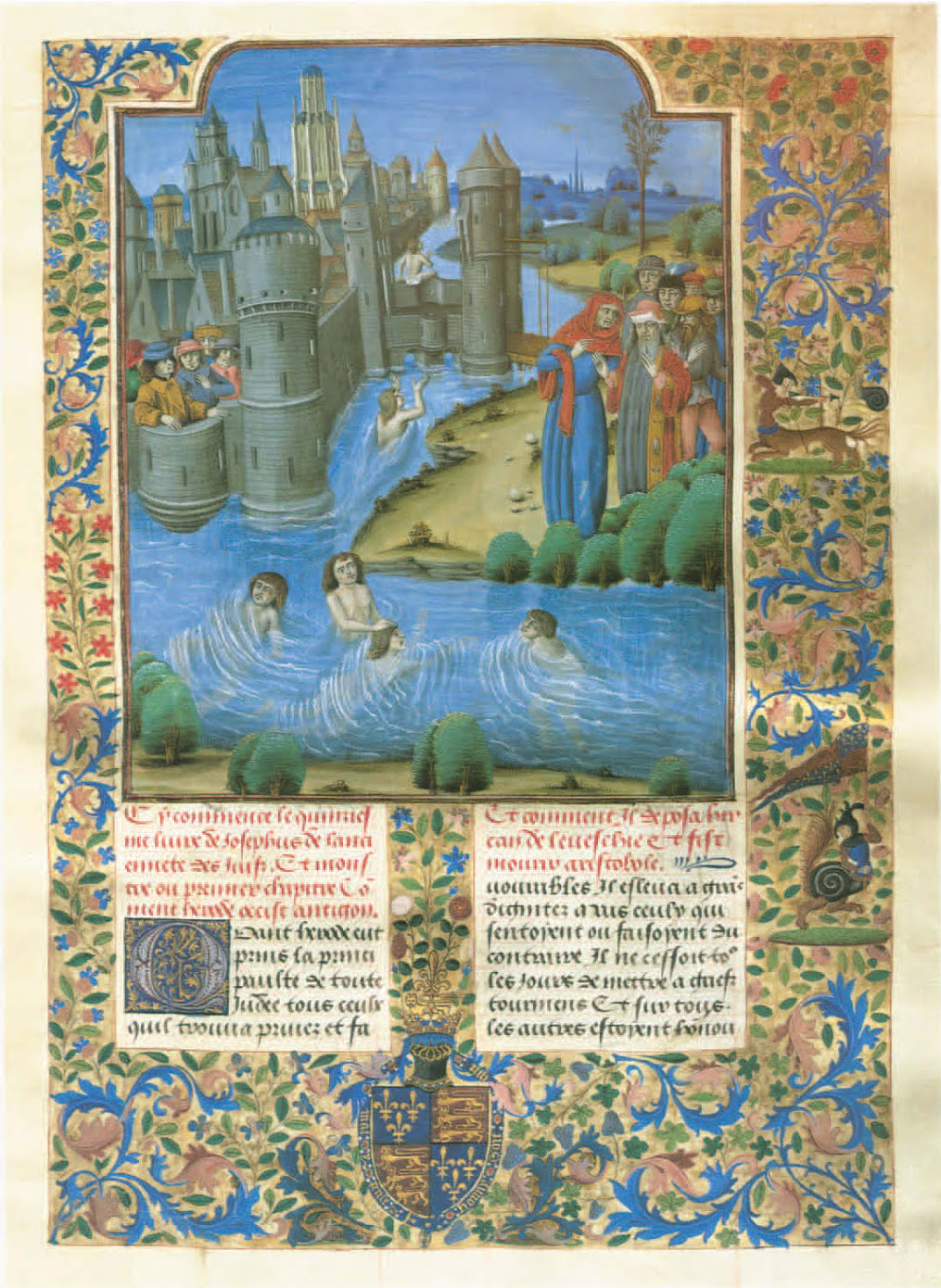
15th-century illuminated manuscript of Josephus' Works

Soane over the course of his career built up an extensive library of 7,783 volumes. This is still housed in the library he designed in his home, now a museum, of 13 Lincoln's Inn Fields. The library covers a wide range of subjects: Greek and Roman classics, poetry, painting, sculpture, history, music, drama, philosophy, grammars, topographical works, encyclopaedias, runs of journals and contemporary novels.

Naturally architectural books account for a large part of the library, and were very important when he came to write his lectures for the Royal Academy. The main architectural books include: several editions of Vitruvius's De architectura, including Latin, English, French and Italian editions, including the commentary on the work by Daniele Barbaro. Julien-David Le Roy's Les Ruines des plus beaux monuments de la Grèce, Johann Joachim Winckelmann's Geschichte der Kunst des Alterthums, in its French translation bought in 1806 just before Soane was appointed to the professorship. Also Marc-Antoine Laugier's Essai sur l'Architecture, and Jacques-François Blondel's nine volumes of Cours d'architecture ou traité de la décoration, distribution et constructions des bâtiments contenant les leçons données en 1750, et les années suivantes.

Soane also acquired several illuminated manuscripts: a 13th-century English Vulgate Bible; a 15th-century Flemish copy of Josephus's works; four books of hours, two Flemish of the 15th century and early 16th century, Dutch of the late 15th century and French 15th century; a French missal dated 1482; Le Livre des Cordonniers de Caen, French 15th century; and Marino Grimani's commentary of the Epistle of St Paul to the Romans, the work of Giulio Clovio.

Other manuscripts include: Francesco di Giorgio's mid-16th century Treatise of Architecture; Nicholas Stone's two account books covering 1631–1642, and his son's (also Nicholas Stone) 1648 sketch book (France and Italy) and Henry Stone's 1638 sketch book; Margaret Cavendish, Duchess of Newcastle-upon-Tyne's The Second Epistle; James Gibbs's A few short cursory remarks on buildings in Rome; Joshua Reynolds's two sketch books from Rome; and Torquato Tasso's early manuscript of Gerusalemme Liberata.

Incunabula in the library include: Cristoforo Landino's Commentario sopra la Comedia di Dante, 1481; S. Brant Stultifera Navis, 1488; and Boethius's De Philosophico Consolatu, 1501. Other early printed books include: J.W. von Cube, Ortus Saniatis, 1517, and Portiforium seu Breviarum ad Sarisbursis ecclesiae usum, 1555; and William Shakespeare's Comedies, Histories and Tragedies of 1623, the First Folio.

== Sir John Soane's Museum ==
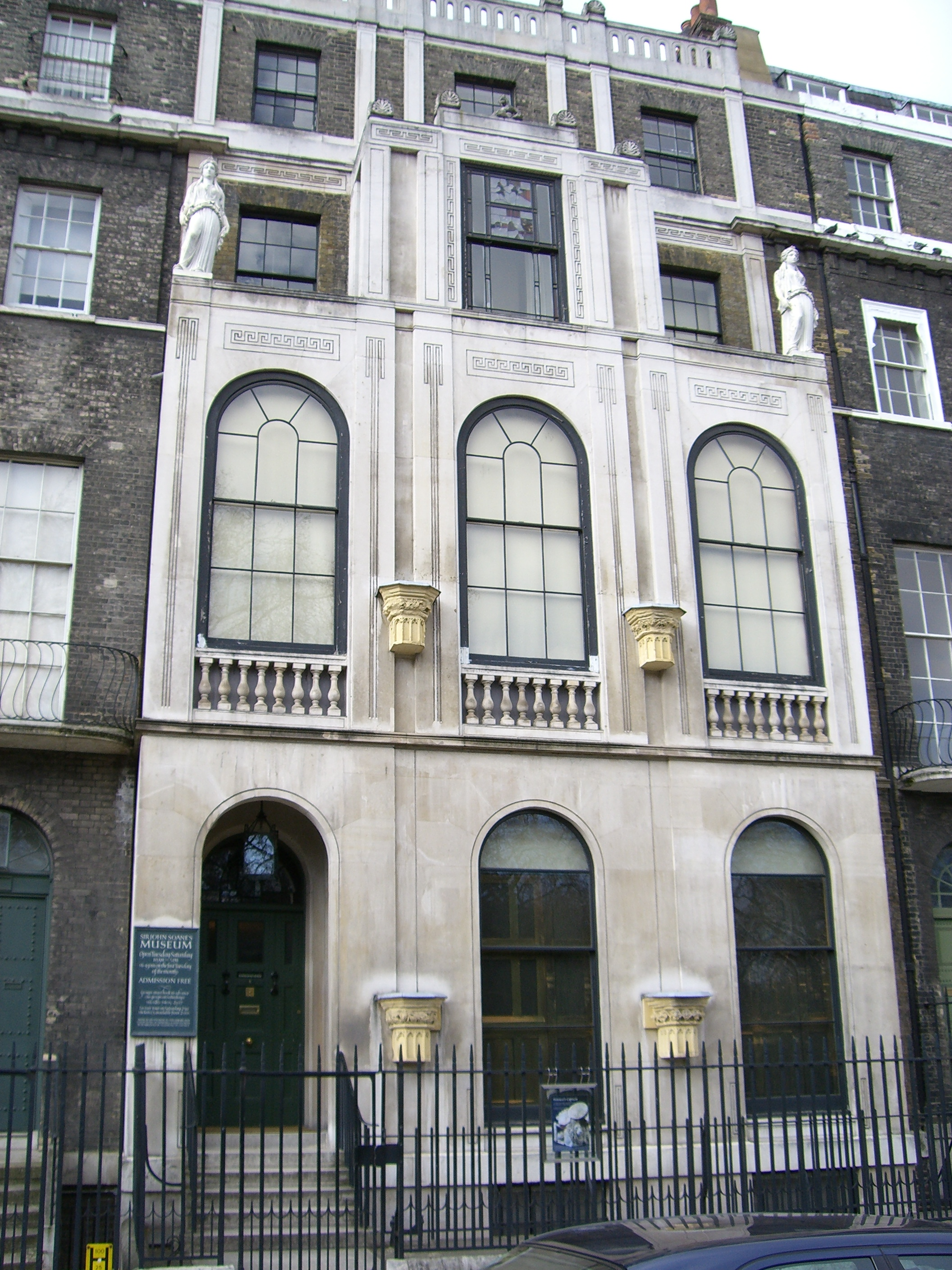
Soane Museum, 13 Lincoln's Inn Fields

In 1792, Soane bought a house at 12 Lincoln's Inn Fields, London. Later purchasing 13 Lincoln's Inn Fields, he used the house as his home and library, but also entertained potential clients in the drawing room. The houses along with 14 Lincoln's Inn Fields, is now Sir John Soane's Museum and is open to the public for free but bookable guided tours are charged.

=== Antiquities, medieval and non-western objects ===
Between 1794 and 1824 Soane remodelled and extended the house into two neighbouring properties – partly to experiment with architectural ideas, and partly to house his growing collection of antiquities and architectural salvage. As his practice prospered, Soane was able to collect objects worthy of the British Museum, including the Sarcophagus of Seti I in 1824.

After the Seti sarcophagus arrived at his house in March 1825, Soane held a three-day party, to which 890 people were invited. The basement where the sarcophagus was housed was lit by over one hundred lamps and candelabra, refreshments were laid on and the exterior of the house was hung with lamps. Among the guests were the Prime Minister Robert Jenkinson, 2nd Earl of Liverpool, and his wife; Robert Peel, Prince Augustus Frederick, Duke of Sussex, Samuel Taylor Coleridge, J. M. W. Turner, Sir Thomas Lawrence, Charles Long, 1st Baron Farnborough, Benjamin Haydon as well as many foreign dignitaries.

He also bought Greek and Roman bronzes, cinerary urns, fragments of Roman mosaics, Greek vases (many displayed above the bookcases in the library), Greek and Roman busts, heads from statues and fragments of sculpture and architectural decoration, and examples of Roman glass. Medieval objects include: architectural fragments, tiles and stained glass. Soane acquired 18th century Chinese ceramics as well as Peruvian pottery. Soane also purchased four Indian ivory chairs and a table.

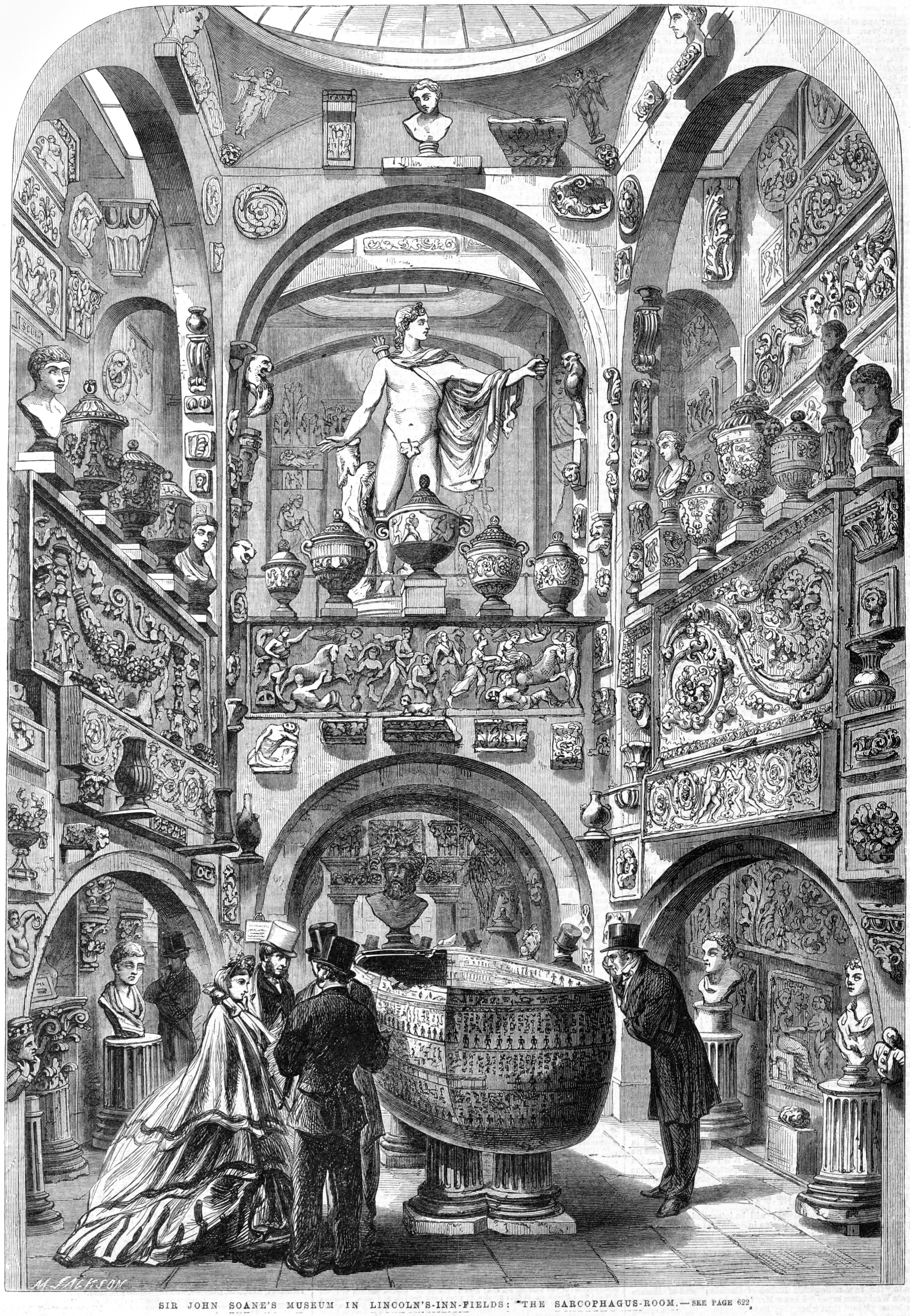
1864 view of the Sarcophagus of Seti I (foreground) in the 'Dome', 13 Lincoln's Inn Fields

=== Sculpture ===
Francis Leggatt Chantrey carved a white marble bust of Soane. Soane acquired Sir Richard Westmacott's plaster model for Nymph unclasping her Zone and the plaster model of John Flaxman's memorial sculpture of William Pitt the Younger. Of the ancient sculptures, a miniature copy of the famous sculpture of Diana of Ephesus is one of the most important in the collection. After the death of his teacher Henry Holland, Soane bought part of his collection of ancient marble fragments of architectural decoration. He also acquired plaster casts of famous antique sculptures.

=== Paintings and drawings ===
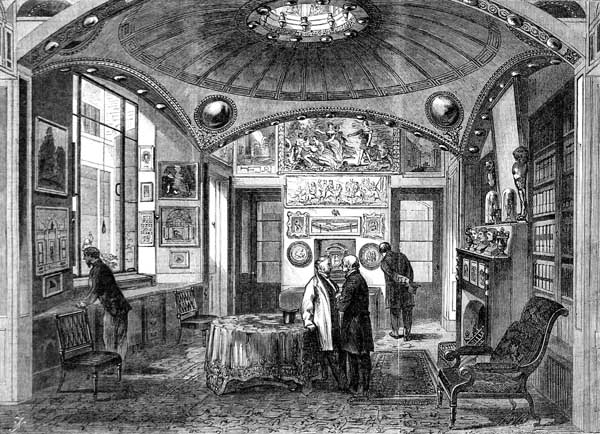
Breakfast Room, 13 Lincoln's Inn Fields

Soane's paintings include four works by Canaletto and paintings by Hogarth: the eight canvases of the A Rake's Progress and the four canvases of the Humours of an Election. Soane acquired three works by his friend J. M. W. Turner. Thomas Lawrence painted a three quarter length portrait of Soane that hangs over the Dining Room fireplace. Soane acquired 15 drawings by Giovanni Battista Piranesi. A sketch of Soane's wife by Soane's friend John Flaxman is framed and displayed in the museum.

=== Architectural drawings and architectural models ===
There are over 30,000 architectural drawings in the collection. Of Soane's drawings of his own designs (many are by his assistants and pupils, most notably Joseph Gandy), there are 601 covering the Bank of England, 6,266 of his other works and 1,080 prepared for the Royal Academy lectures. There are an additional 423 Soane drawings in the collection of the Victoria and Albert Museum.

Other architects with drawings in the collection are by Christopher Wren, there are 8,856 drawings by Robert Adam and James Adam, John Thorpes book of architecture, George Dance the Elder's 293 and George Dance the younger's 1,303, housed in a specially designed cabinet, Sir William Chambers, James Playfair, Matthew Brettingham, Thomas Sandby, etc. There are a large number of Italian drawings. Of the 252 architectural models in the collection, 118 are of Soane's own buildings. These architectural models were first installed in a purpose-built model room located in the attic in 1830, which was then relocated and expanded in 1835 within the former bedroom of Soane’s late wife.

=== Legal creation of the Museum ===
In 1833, he obtained an Act of Parliament, sponsored by Joseph Hume to bequeath the house and collection to the British Nation to be made into a museum of architecture, now the Sir John Soane's Museum. George Soane, realising that if the museum was set up he would lose his inheritance, persuaded William Cobbett to try and stop the bill, but failed.

== Awards, official posts and recognition ==
- On 10 December 1772 Soane was awarded the Royal Academy's silver medal.
- On 10 December 1776 Soane was awarded the Royal Academy's gold medal.
- On 10 December 1777 Soane was awarded the Royal Academy's travelling scholarship.
- On 16 October 1788 Soane was appointed architect to the Bank of England
- On 2 November 1795 Soane was elected an Associate Royal Academician.
- On 21 May 1796 Soane was elected to the Society of Antiquaries of London.
- In May 1800 Soane was one of the 280 proprietors of the Royal Institution.
- On 10 February 1802 Soane was elected a Royal Academician of the Royal Academy.
- On 28 March 1806, Soane was made Professor of Architecture at the Royal Academy, a post which he held until his death.
- In 1810 Soane was made a Justice of the Peace for the county of Middlesex.
- On 15 November 1821 Soane was elected a Fellow of the Royal Society.
- On 21 September 1831, Soane received a knighthood from King William IV.
- On 20 June 1835, Soane was presented by Sir Jeffry Wyattville with a gold medal, from the 'Architects of England', modelled by Francis Leggatt Chantrey it showed the likeness of Soane on one side and the north-west corner of the Bank of England on the other.

== Personal life ==
=== Marriage and children ===
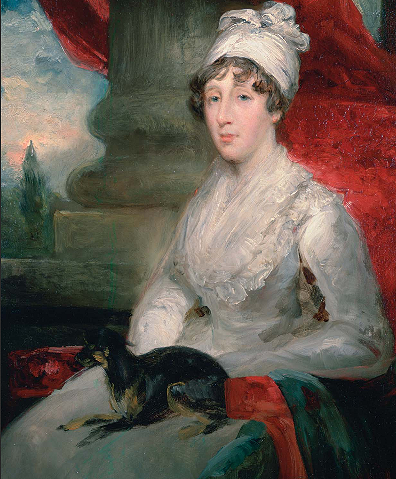
Eliza Soane, holding her pet dog, "Fanny", painted by John Jackson.

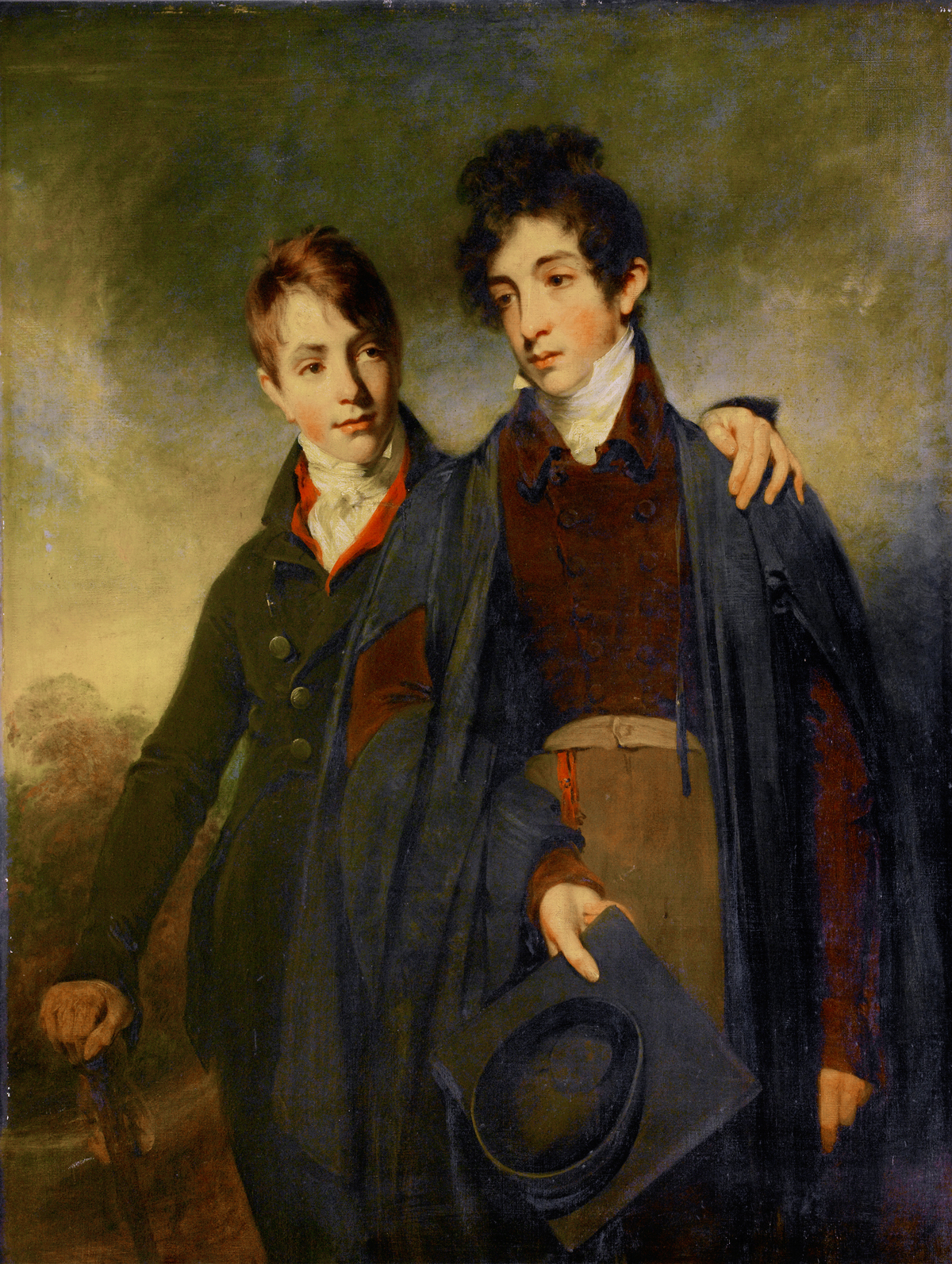
Soane's sons, George and John, by William Owen (1805).

On 24 June 1781, Soane leased rooms on the first floor of 53 Margaret Street, Westminster, for £40 per annum. It was here he would live for the first few years of his married life and where all his children would be born. In July 1783, he bought a grey mare that he stabled nearby. On 10 January 1784, Soane took a Miss Elizabeth Smith to the theatre, then on 7 February, she took tea with Soane and friends, and they began attending plays and concerts together regularly. She was the niece and ward of a London builder George Wyatt, whom Soane would have known as he rebuilt Newgate Prison. They married on 21 August 1784 at Christ Church, Southwark. He always called his wife Eliza, and she would become his confidante.

Their first child, John, was born on 29 April 1786. His second son, George, was born just before Christmas 1787 but the boy died just six months later. The third son, also called George, was born on 28 September 1789. Their final son, Henry, was born on 10 October 1790, but died the following year from whooping cough.

=== Soane's various houses ===
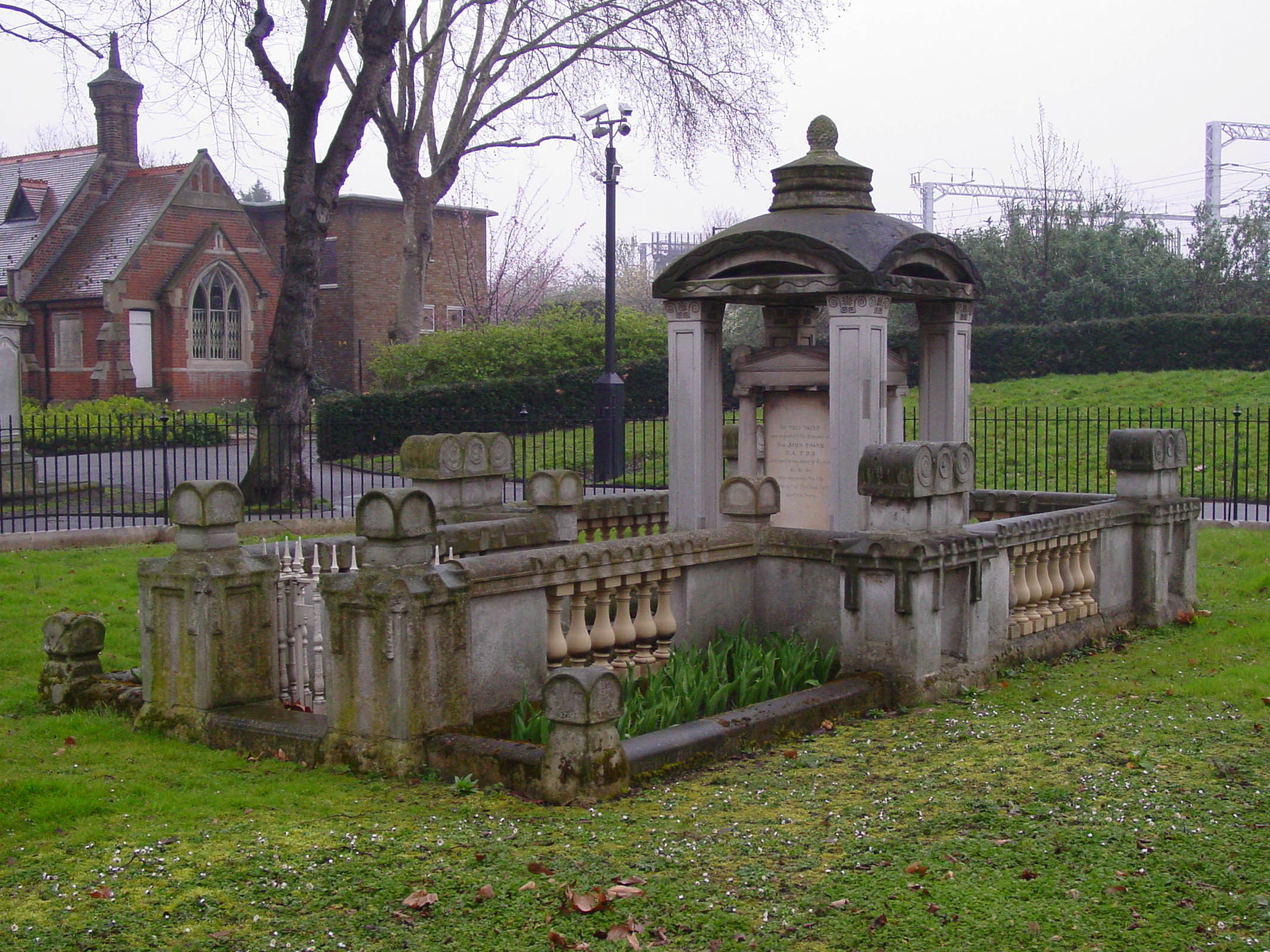
Sir John Soane's family tomb in the Old St Pancras churchyard (1816)

On the death of George Wyatt in February 1790, the Soanes inherited money and property, including a house in Albion Place, Southwark, where Soane moved his office.

On 30 June 1792, Soane purchased 12 Lincoln's Inn Fields for £2100. He demolished the existing house and rebuilt it to his own design, the Soanes moving in on 18 January 1794. By 1800, Soane was rich enough to purchase Pitzhanger Manor Ealing as a country retreat, for £4,500 on 5 September 1800. Apart from a wing designed by George Dance, Soane demolished the house and rebuilt it to his own design and was occupied by 1804, Soane used the manor to entertain friends and used to go fishing in the local streams. The building was not only designed to showcase Soane's work, but also as a pedagogical environment for his young son George, who Soane hoped would follow in his professional footsteps. Undeterred by his child's reluctance, Soane only grew more dedicated to establishing a professional legacy and established a formalised program of architecture education when he purchased his house at Lincoln's Inn Fields, in London.

In June 1808, Soane purchased 13 Lincoln's Inn Fields for £4,200, initially renting the house to its former owner and extending his office over the garden to the rear. On 17 July 1812, number 13 was demolished, the house was rebuilt and the Soanes moved in during October 1813. In 1823, Soane purchased 14 Lincoln's Inn Fields, he demolished the house, building the Picture Room attached to No. 13 over the site of the stables, and in March 1825 he rebuilt the house to externally match No. 12.

=== Family problems ===
Soane hoped that one or both of his sons would also become architects. His purchase of Pitzhanger Manor was partially an inducement to this end. But both sons became increasingly wayward in their attitude and behaviour, showing not the slightest interest in architecture. John was lazy and suffered from ill health, whereas George had an uncontrollable temper. As a consequence, Soane decided to sell Pitzhanger in July 1810.

John was sent to Margate in 1811 to try to help his illness and it was here that he became involved with a woman called Maria Preston. Soane agreed reluctantly to John's and Maria's marriage on 6 June, on the agreement that her father would produce a dowry of £2000, which failed to happen. Meanwhile, George who had been studying law at Cambridge University developed a friendship with James Boaden. George developed a relationship with Boaden's daughter Agnes and one month after his brother's wedding married her on 5 July. He wrote to his mother, "I have married Agnes to spite you and father".

George Soane tried to extort money from his father in March 1814 by demanding £350 per annum, and claiming he would otherwise be forced to become an actor. Agnes gave birth to twins in September, one of whom died shortly after. By November, her husband George Soane had been imprisoned for debt and fraud. In January 1815, Eliza paid her son's debts and repaid the person he had defrauded to ensure his release from prison.

In 1815, an article was published in the Champion for 10 to 24 September entitled, "The Present Low State of the Arts in England and more particularly of Architecture". In the article Soane was singled out for personal attack; although anonymous it soon emerged that his son George had written the article. On 13 October, Mrs Soane wrote "Those are George's doing. He has given me my death blow. I shall never be able to hold up my head again". Soane's wife had been suffering from ill health for some time, and died on 22 November 1815. Her body was interred on 1 December in the churchyard of St Pancras Old Church. Soane wrote in his diary for that day, "The burial of all that is dear to me in this world, and all I wished to live for!" George and Agnes had another child, this time a son, Frederick (born 1815).

In 1816, Soane designed the tomb above the vault his wife was buried in. It is built from Carrara marble and Portland stone. The tomb avoids any Christian symbolism; the roof has a pine cone finial, the symbol in Ancient Egypt for regeneration, below which is carved a serpent swallowing its own tail, a symbol of eternity. There are also carvings of boys holding extinguished torches, symbols of death. The inscription is:

Sacred to the Memory of Elizabeth, The Wife of John Soane, Architect She Died the 22nd November, 1815.
With Distinguished Talents She United an Amiable and Affectionate Heart.
Her Piety was Unaffected, Her Integrity Undeviating, Her Manners Displayed Alike Decision and Energy, Kindness and Suavity.
These, the Peculiar Characteristics of Her Mind, Remained Untainted by an Extensive Intercourse with the World.

The design of the tomb was a direct influence on Giles Gilbert Scott's design for the red telephone box.

Soane's elder son John died on 21 October 1823, and was also buried in the vault. Maria, Soane's daughter-in-law, was now a widow with young children, including a son also called John, in need of support. Soane set up a trust fund of £10,000 to support the family.

Soane found out in 1824 that his son George was living in a ménage à trois with his wife and her sister by whom he had a child called George Manfred. Soane's grandson Fred and his mother were both subjected to domestic violence by George Soane, including beatings, and in Agnes's case being dragged by her hair from a room. Soane initially refused to help them while they remained living with his son, who was in debt. However, by February 1834 Soane relented and was paying Agnes £200 per annum, also paying for Fred's education. In the hope that Fred would become an architect, after he left school, Soane placed him with architect John Tarring. In January 1835 Tarring asked Soane to remove Fred, who was staying out late often in the company of a Captain Westwood, a known homosexual. Maria, Soane's daughter-in-law, lived until 1855 and is buried on the edge of the south roundel in Brompton Cemetery.

=== Personal beliefs, travels and health ===
On Monday 6 August 1810, Soane and his wife set off on a thirteen-day tour of England and Wales. They normally rose at five or six in the morning and would visit many towns and monuments a day. Starting in Oxford they visited New College, Oxford, Merton College, Oxford, Blenheim Palace and Woodstock, Oxfordshire, where they stayed the night. Next day they went to Stratford-upon-Avon and Shakespeare's Birthplace, Church of the Holy Trinity, Stratford-upon-Avon, to visit Shakespeare's tomb, Kenilworth Castle, Warwick Castle, Whitley Abbey, Coventry and on to Lichfield. They next travelled to Liverpool, staying for four nights at the Liverpool Arms near Liverpool Town Hall. They attended a performance of Othello, with George Frederick Cooke as Iago. Among the people they visited was Soane's former assistant Joseph Gandy, then living in the city. Their son John was living and studying with Gandy, in a failed attempt to become an architect. They visited John Foster (architect). Leaving Liverpool on Saturday 11 August, they crossed the River Mersey to the Wirral Peninsula and on to Chester where they saw the Rows and greatly admired Thomas Harrison's work at Chester Castle. From Chester they visited Wrexham, and Ellesmere, Shropshire. On Sunday they moved on to Shrewsbury, visiting architect George Steuart's St Chad's Church.

On Monday 13 August, they headed for Coalbrookdale, with The Iron Bridge then on to Buildwas Abbey. The journey continued down the River Severn to Bridgnorth then Ludlow and Ludlow Castle, and Leominster. On Wednesday 15 August, they were in Hereford, where they visited Hereford Cathedral and the gaol designed by his friend John Nash. Continuing on they reached Ross-on-Wye, from where they journeyed down the River Wye stopping at Tintern Abbey, glimpsed Piercefield House – one of Soane's designs – and arrived in Chepstow, before moving on to Gloucester Cathedral and Gloucester where they spent the night. The next day they headed for Cheltenham, returning through the Cotswolds, visiting Northleach and Witney, where they spent their last night on the tour. Next day they travelled via High Wycombe and Uxbridge, on to their home at Pitzhanger Manor in Ealing for a day of angling. They returned at nine o'clock at night on Monday, 17 August, to their home in Lincoln's Inn Fields.

Soane was initiated on 1 December 1813 as a freemason under the newly established United Grand Lodge of England. By 1828, he had been given notable responsibilities for the fabric of Freemasons' Hall, and had been appointed as a Grand Officer of UGLE, with the rank of Grand Superintendent of Works. A portrait depicting Soane in the regalia of this rank hangs in the collection at Sir John Soane's Museum, London.

Soane did not like organised religion and was a Deist. He was influenced by the ideas that belonged to the enlightenment, and had read Voltaire's and Jean-Jacques Rousseau's works. Soane was taken ill on 27 December 1813 and was incapacitated until 28 March 1814, when he underwent an operation by Astley Cooper on his bladder to remove a fistula. For the first time since his Grand Tour Soane decided to travel abroad, he set off on 15 August 1815 for Paris returning on 5 September. In the summer of 1816, a friend, Barbara Hofland, persuaded him to take a holiday in Harrogate, there they visited Knaresborough, Plompton and its rocks, Ripon, Newby Hall, Fountains Abbey and Studley Royal Park, Castle Howard, Harewood House and Masham.

Soane visited Paris again in 1819, setting off on 21 August, he travelled via Dunkirk, Abbeville and Beauvais arriving in Paris. He stayed at 10 rue Vivienne, over the following days he visited, the Pont de Neuilly, Les Invalides, Palais du Roi de Rome, Père Lachaise Cemetery, Étienne-Louis Boullée's chapel at Sainte-Roche, the Arc de Triomphe, Vincennes and the Château de Vincennes, Sèvres, Saint-Cloud, Arcueil with its ancient Roman aqueduct, Basilica of St Denis, Chamber of Deputies of France, Saint-Étienne-du-Mont, Arc de Triomphe du Carrousel, Musée du Louvre, Luxembourg Palace, Palace of Versailles with the Grand Trianon and Petit Trianon with its Hameau de la reine, Halle aux blés, Halle aux vins, Jardin des Plantes, Bassin de la Villette with its Rotonde de la Villette by Claude Nicolas Ledoux, Tuileries Palace, Château de Malmaison, he failed to gain admission to the Château de Bagatelle, he travelled home via Amiens and Amiens Cathedral, Abbeville, stopping off to visit Canterbury and Canterbury Cathedral.

On 24 December 1825, Soane underwent an operation to have a cataract removed from his eye.

In 1835, Soane had this to say: "Devoted to Architecture from my childhood, I have through my life pursued it with the enthusiasm of a passion."

=== Friends ===
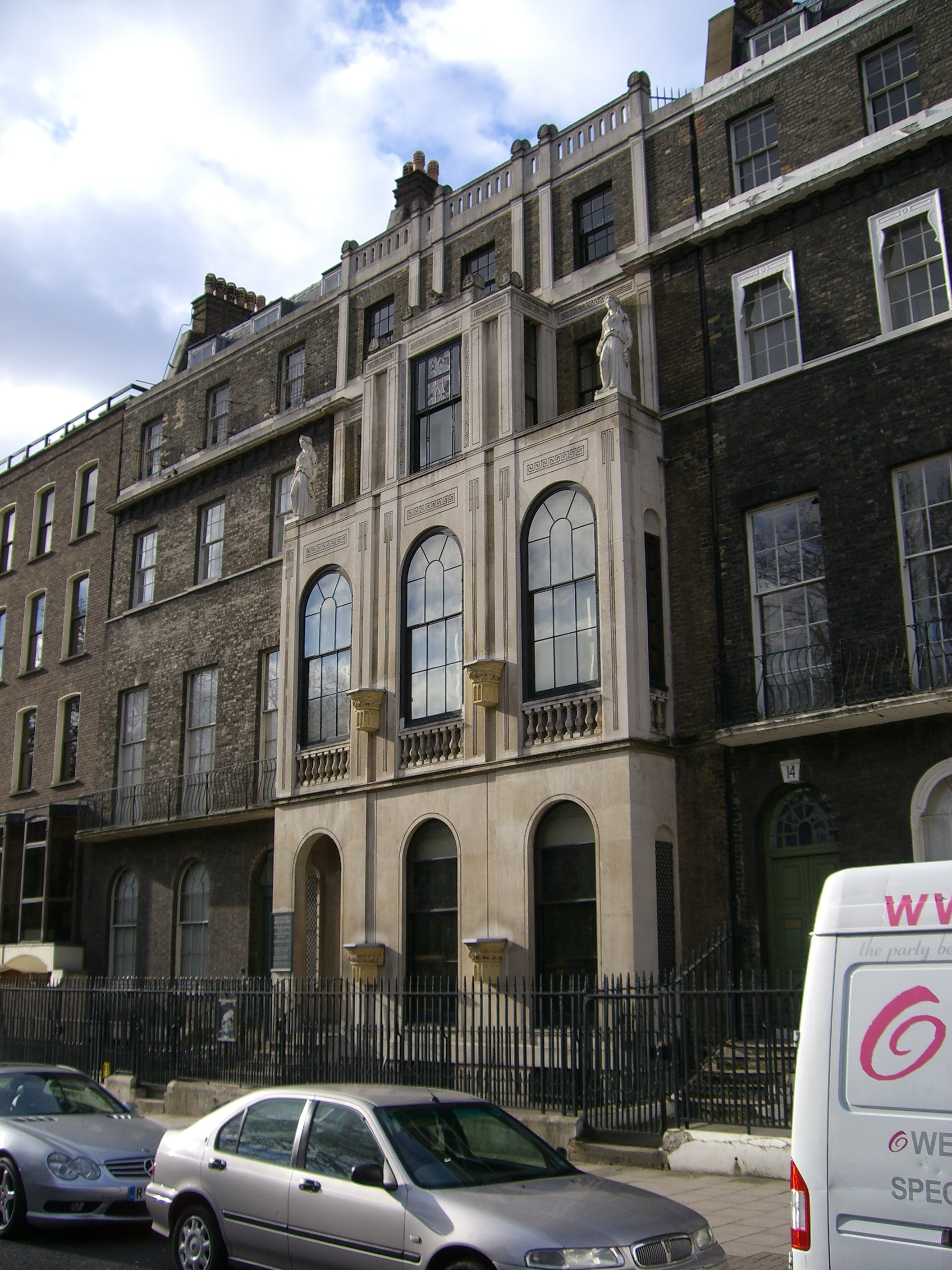
12, 13 and 14 Lincoln's Inn Fields

Soane counted many members of the Royal Academy as friends, including J. M. W. Turner, with whom he spent the Christmas after his wife's death; Soane also owned three works by the artist. John Flaxman, professor of sculpture at the Royal Academy, was an old friend and Soane also acquired several plaster casts of Flaxman's work for his museum. Soane also counted Thomas Banks as a friend (and owned sculptures by him), and Thomas Lawrence, who painted Soane's portrait. Despite the professional falling-out with his old master, George Dance the Younger, they remained firm friends. After Dance's death Soane purchased his drawings. After the death of his other teacher, Henry Holland, Soane tried to buy his drawings and papers, but found they had been destroyed; he did however purchase some of his antique sculptures. Despite being professional rivals, Soane got on with fellow architect John Nash; they often dined together. Soane called on William Thomas Beckford both in London and when he was taking the waters in Bath in 1829. Soane had other friends including James Perry, Thomas Leverton Donaldson, Barbara Hofland and Rowland Burdon, whose friendship was formed while on the Grand Tour.

=== Death and funeral ===
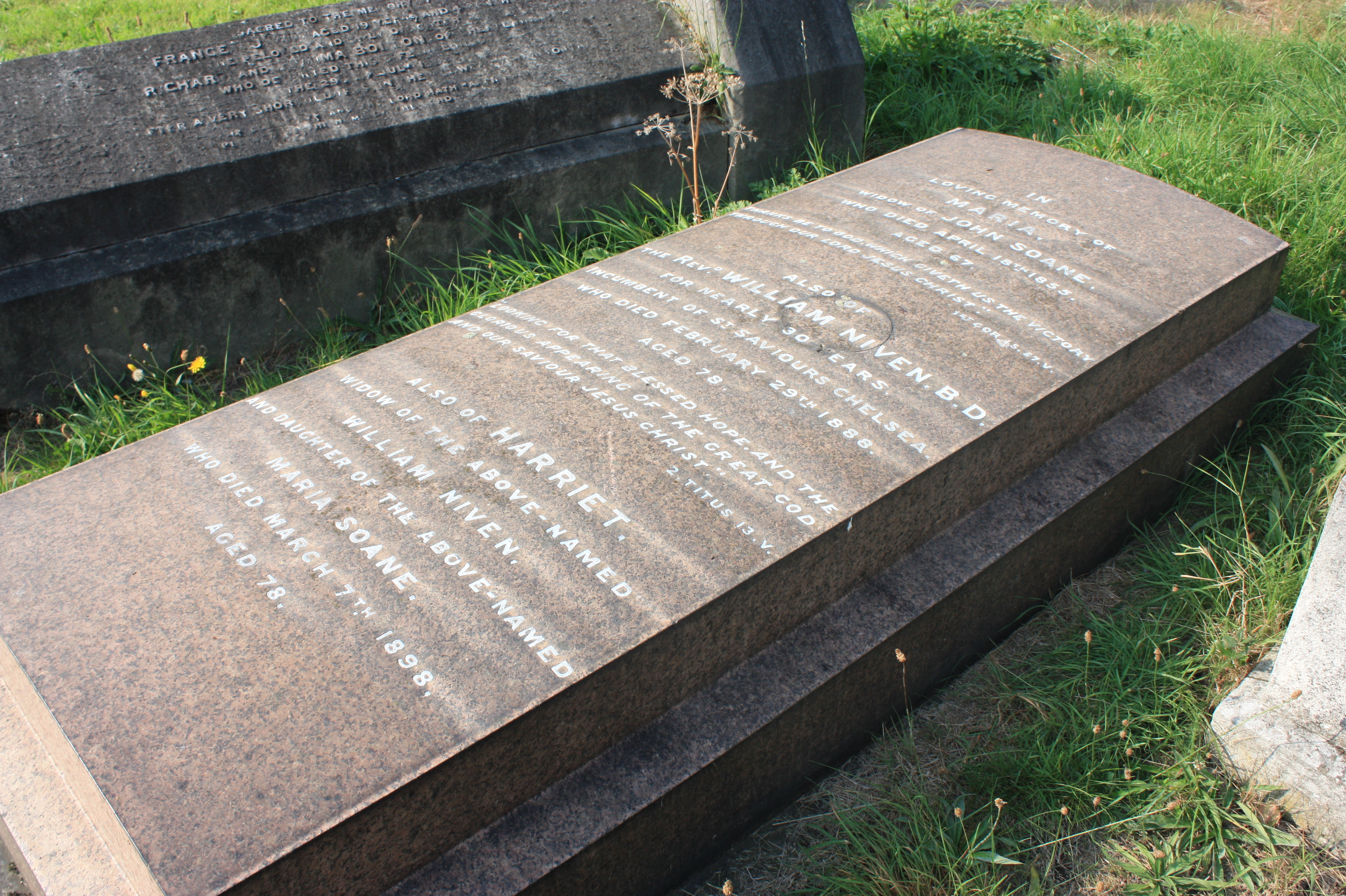
The grave of Maria Preston, widow of John Soane Jr. and Sir John Soane's daughter-in-law, at Brompton Cemetery

Soane died a widower, estranged from his surviving son, George, whom he felt had betrayed him, having contributed to his wife's death. Having caught a chill, Soane died in 13 Lincoln's Inn Fields at half past three on Friday 20 January 1837. His obituary appeared in The Times on Monday 23 January. Following a private funeral service, at his own request "plain without ostentation or parade", he was buried in the same vault as his wife and elder son.

Within days of his father's death George Soane, left an annuity of £52 per annum, challenged Soane's will. Soane stated that he was left so little because "his general misconduct and constant opposition to my wishes evinced in the general tenor of his life". To his daughter-in-law Agnes he left £40 per annum "not to be subject to the debts or control of her said husband". The grounds for overthrowing the will were that his father was insane. On 1 August 1837 the judge at the Prerogative court rejected the challenge. George appealed but on 26 November dropped his suit.

== Pupils and assistants ==
From 1784 Soane took a new pupil on roughly ever other year, these were: J. Adams, George Bailey, George Basevi, S. Burchell, H. Burgess, J. Buxton, Robert Dennis Chantrell, Thomas Chawner, F. Copland, E. Davis, E. Foxall, J.H. Good, Thomas Jeans, David Laing, Thomas Lee, C. Malton, John McDonnell, Arthur Patrick Mee, Frederick Meyer, David Mocatta, Henry Parke, Charles Edward Ernest Papendiek, David Richardson, W.E. Rolfe, John Sanders (his first pupil, taken on 1 September 1784), Henry Hake Seward, Thomas Sword, B.J. Storace, Charles Tyrrell and Thomas Williams. His most famous and successful pupil was Sir Robert Smirke (who, as a consequence of a personality contradictory to that of Soane, stayed less than a year).

Among the more renowned architects who attended Soane's lectures at the Royal Academy, but weren't actually articled to him as a student was Decimus Burton, who was one of the most famous and most successful architects of the 19th century. Other successful architects who as students attended the lectures were James Pennethorne, George Gilbert Scott, Owen Jones and Henry Roberts.

Soane's main assistants he employed at various times were: Joseph Gandy, who prepared many of the perspective drawings of Soane's designs, Christopher Ebdon, J.W. Hiort, G.E. Ives, William Lodder, R. Morrison, D. Paton, George Allen Underwood and George Wightwick.

The office routine for both assistants and pupils was in summer to work from seven in the morning to seven at night Monday to Saturday and in winter eight to eight, often assistants and pupils would be sent out to supervise building work on site. Students would be given time off to study at the Royal Academy and for holidays. The Students' room at the museum still exists, it is a mezzanine at the rear of the building, lined with two long wooden benches with stools, surrounded by plaster casts of classical architectural details and lit by a long skylight. The students were trained in surveying, measuring, costing, superintendence and draftsmanship, normally a student stayed for five to seven years.

As an example Robert Dennis Chantrell's indentures were signed on 14 January 1807 just after he was fourteen (a typical age to join the office), his apprenticeship was to last for seven years, at a cost of one hundred Guineas (early in Soane's career he charged £50 and this grew to 175 guineas), Soane would provide 'board, lodgings and wearing apparel'; Chantrell only arrived in the office on 15 June 1807. It was normal to serve a probationary period of a few weeks.

In 1788 Soane defined the professional responsibility of an architect:

The business of the architect is to make the designs and estimates, to direct the works and to measure and value the different parts; he is the intermediate agent between the employer, whose honour and interest he is to study, and the mechanic, whose rights he is to defend. His situation implies great trust; he is responsible for the mistakes, negligences, and ignorances of those he employs; and above all, he is to take care that the workmen's bills do not exceed his own estimates. If these are the duties of an architect, with what propriety can his situation and that of the builder, or the contractor be united?

== Soane's published writings ==
Soane published several books related to architecture and an autobiography:

- Designs in Architecture, Consisting of Plans for Temples, Baths, Casines, Pavilions, Garden-Seats, Obelisks and Other Buildings, 1778, 2nd Edition 1797
- Plans, Elevations and Sections of Buildings Erected in the Counties of Norfolk, Suffolk, etc., 1788
- Sketches in Architecture Containing Plans of Cottages, Villas and Other Useful Buildings, 1793
- Plans, Elevations and Perspective Views of Pitzhanger Manor House, 1802
- Designs for Public and Private Buildings, 1828
- Descriptions of the House and Museum Lincoln's Inn Fields, editions: 1830, 1832 and 1835–6
- Memoirs of the Professional Life of an Architect, 1835
  The director of the Soane Museum, Arthur T. Bolton, edited and published Soane's twelve Royal Academy lectures in 1929 as Lectures on Architecture by Sir John Soane.

== Selected list of architectural works ==
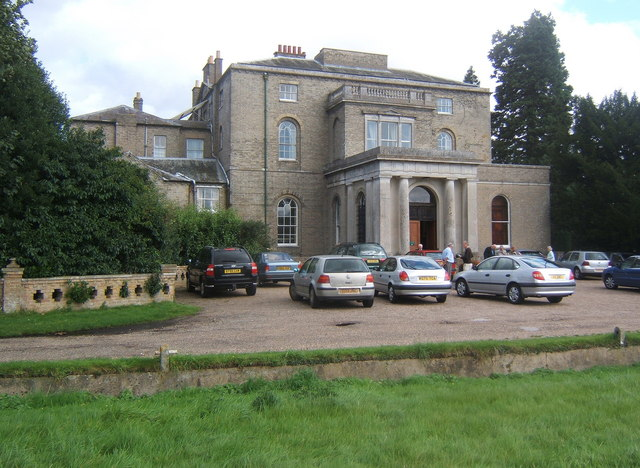
Letton Hall, 1783

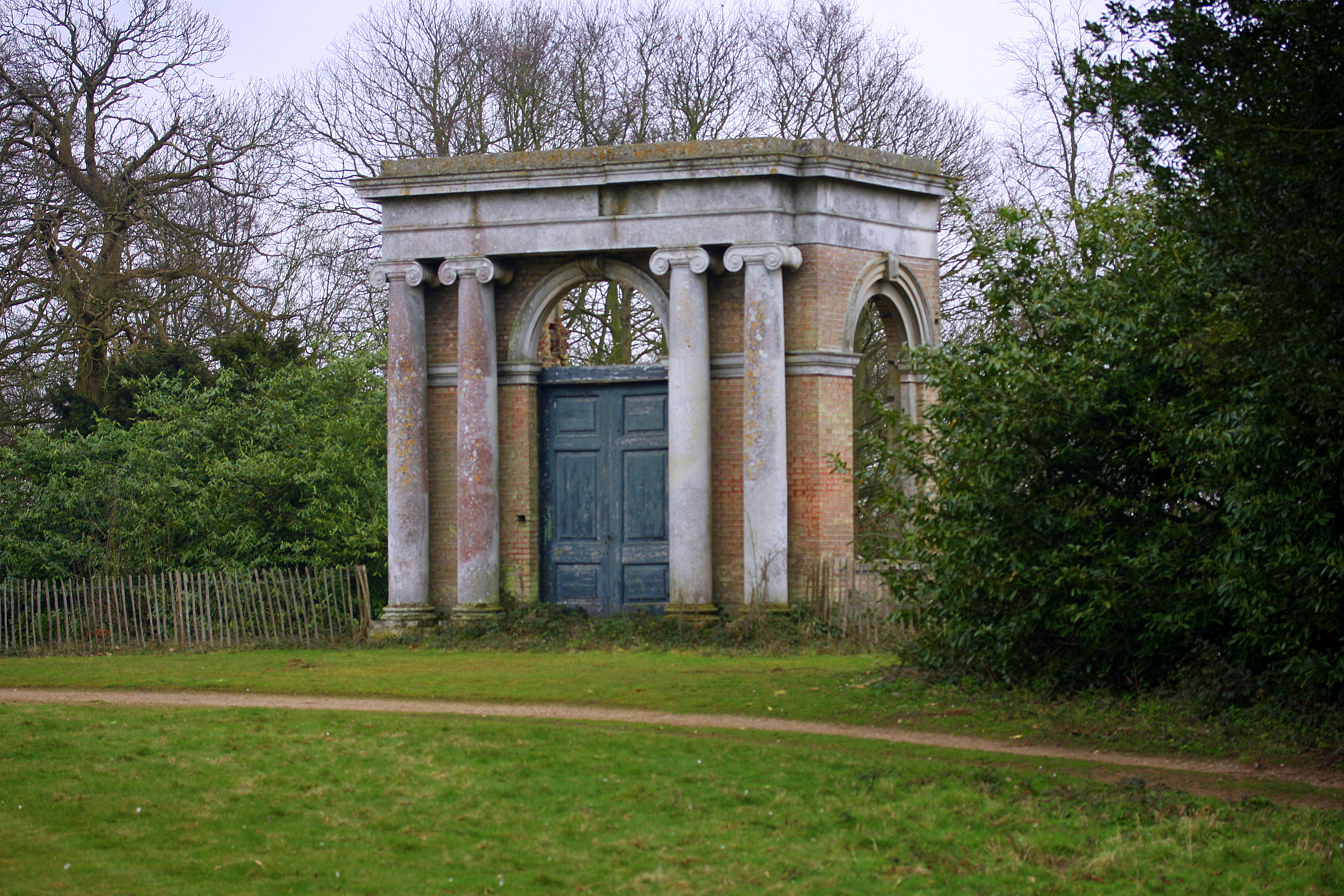
Tendring Hall, 1784, the remaining porch after demolition in 1955

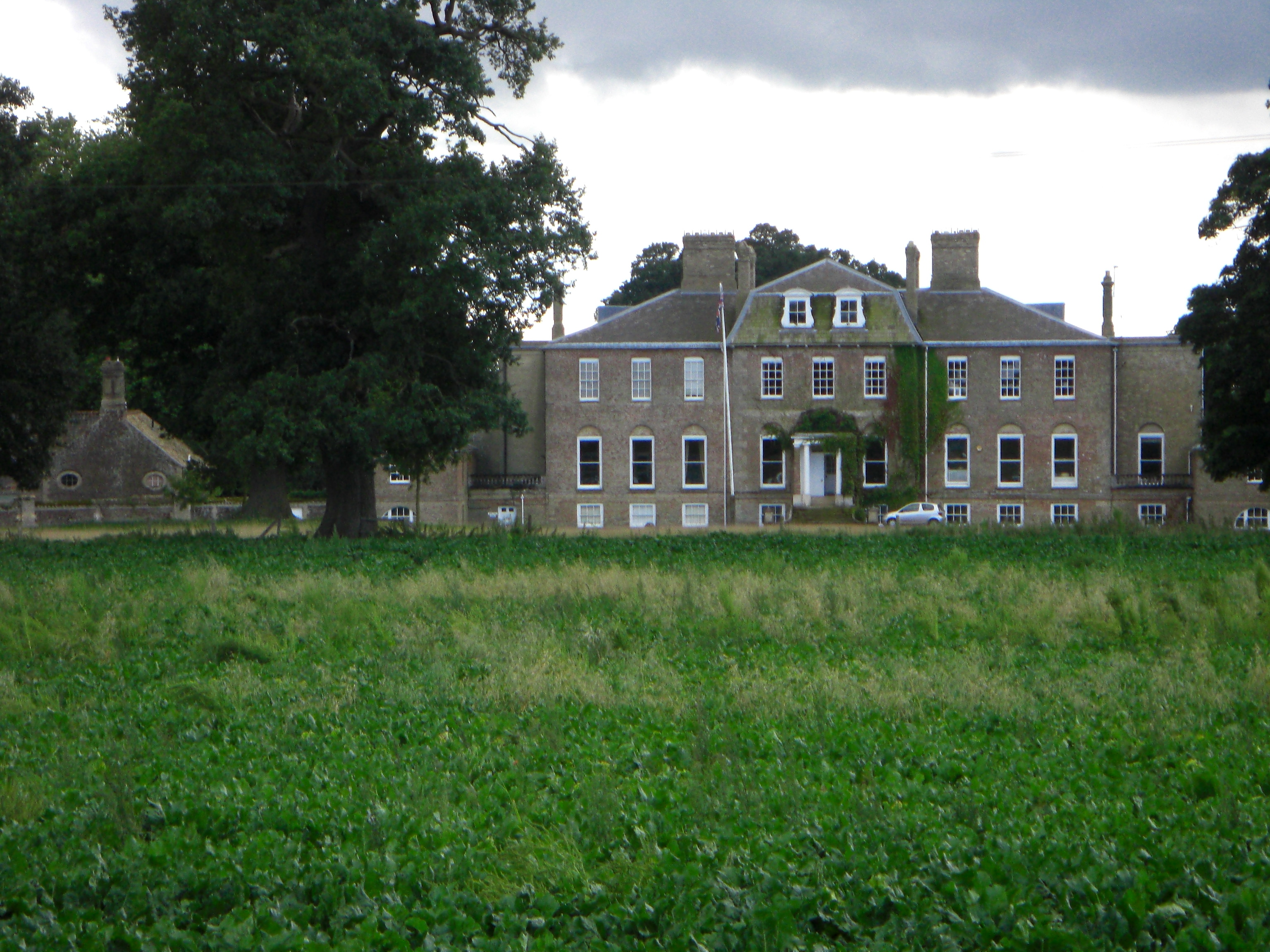
Ryston Hall, remodelled 1786

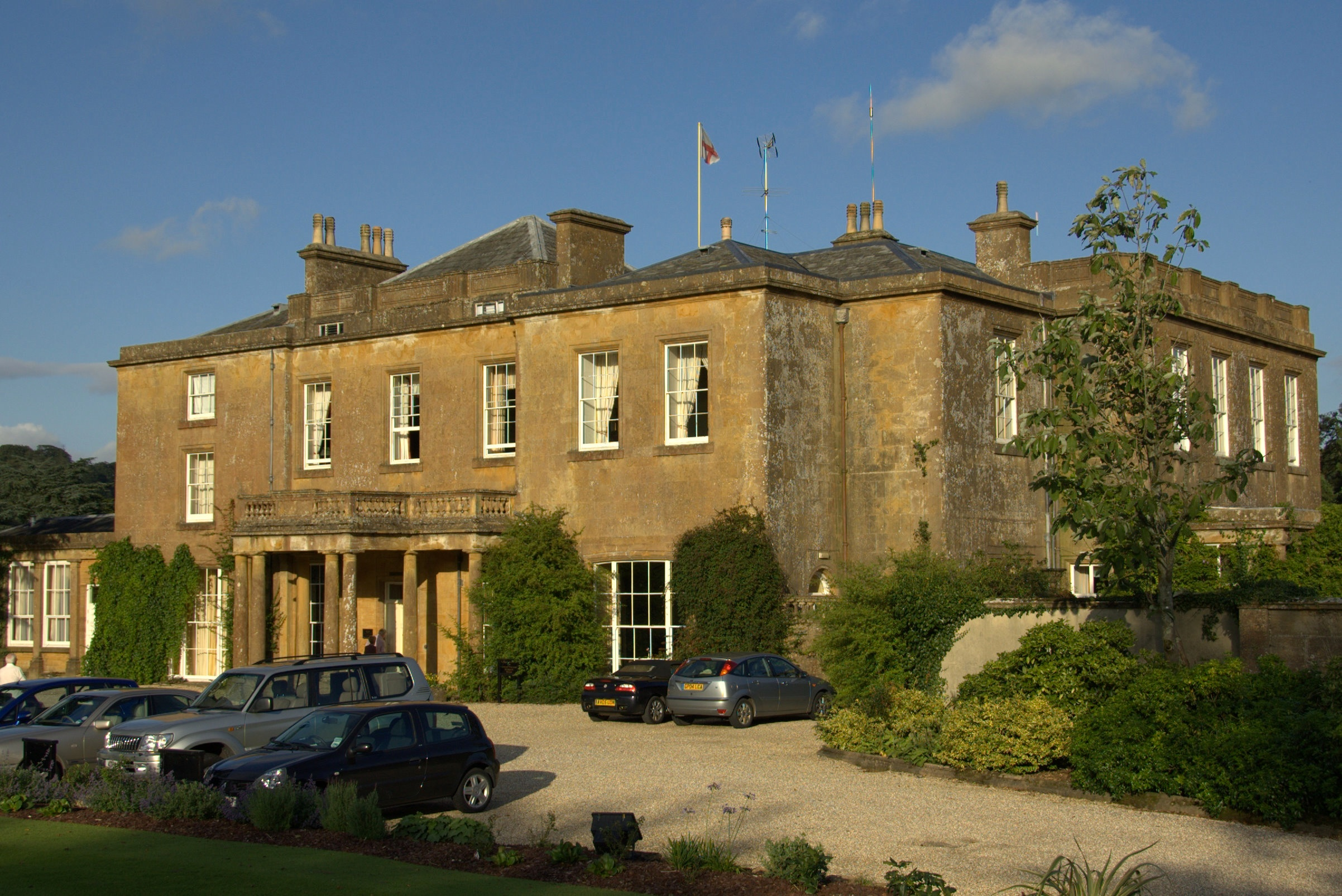
Cricket St. Thomas House, 1786

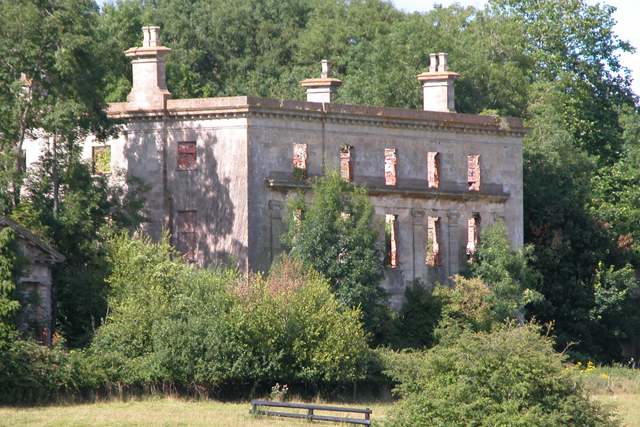
Piercefield House, 1788–93

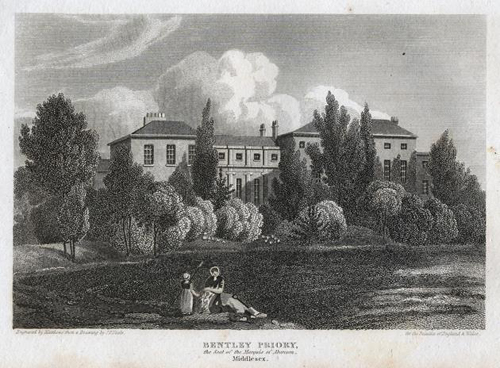
Bentley Priory, 1788–1801, shown c.1800; it was later remodelled

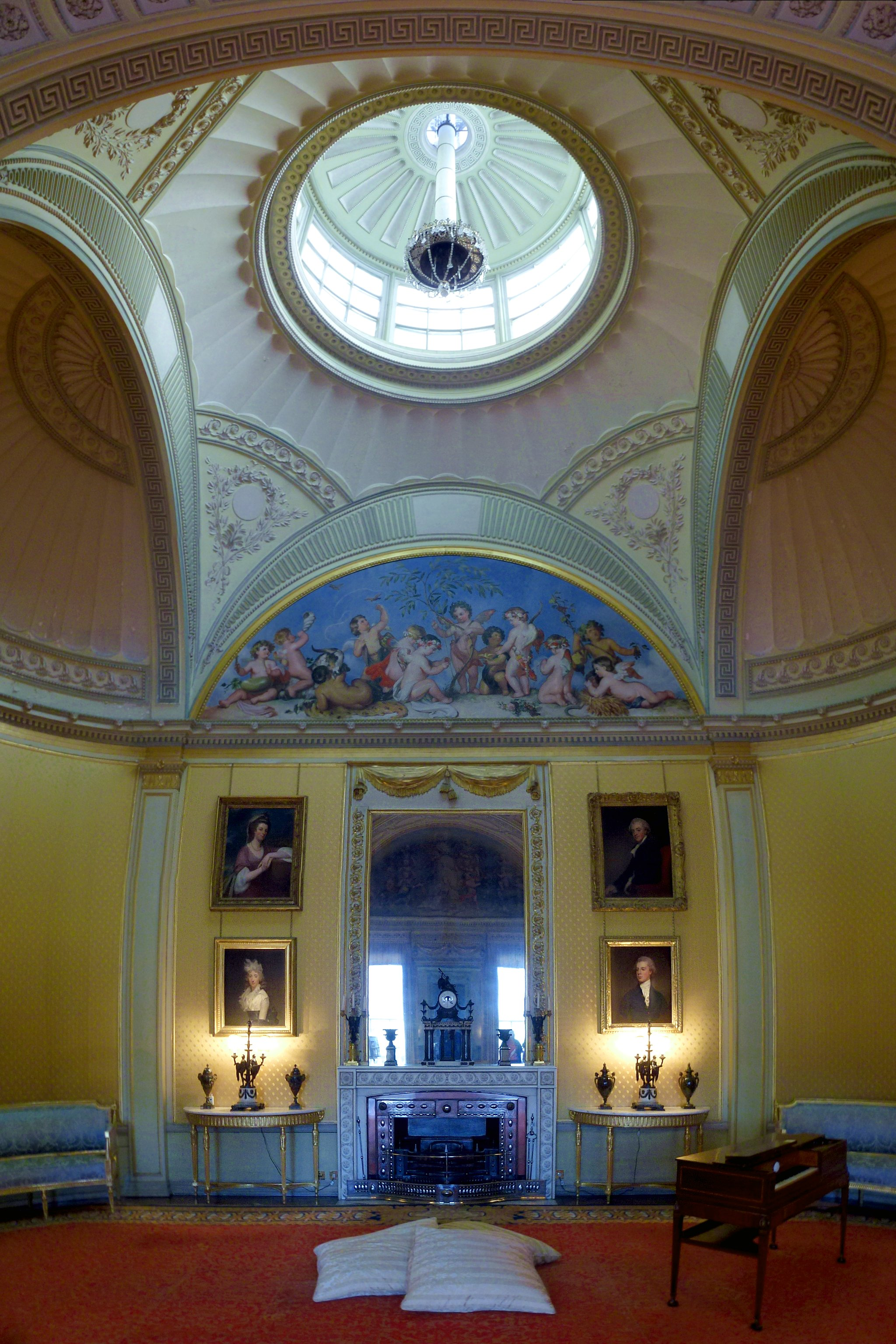
Yellow Drawing Room, Wimpole Hall, 1791–93

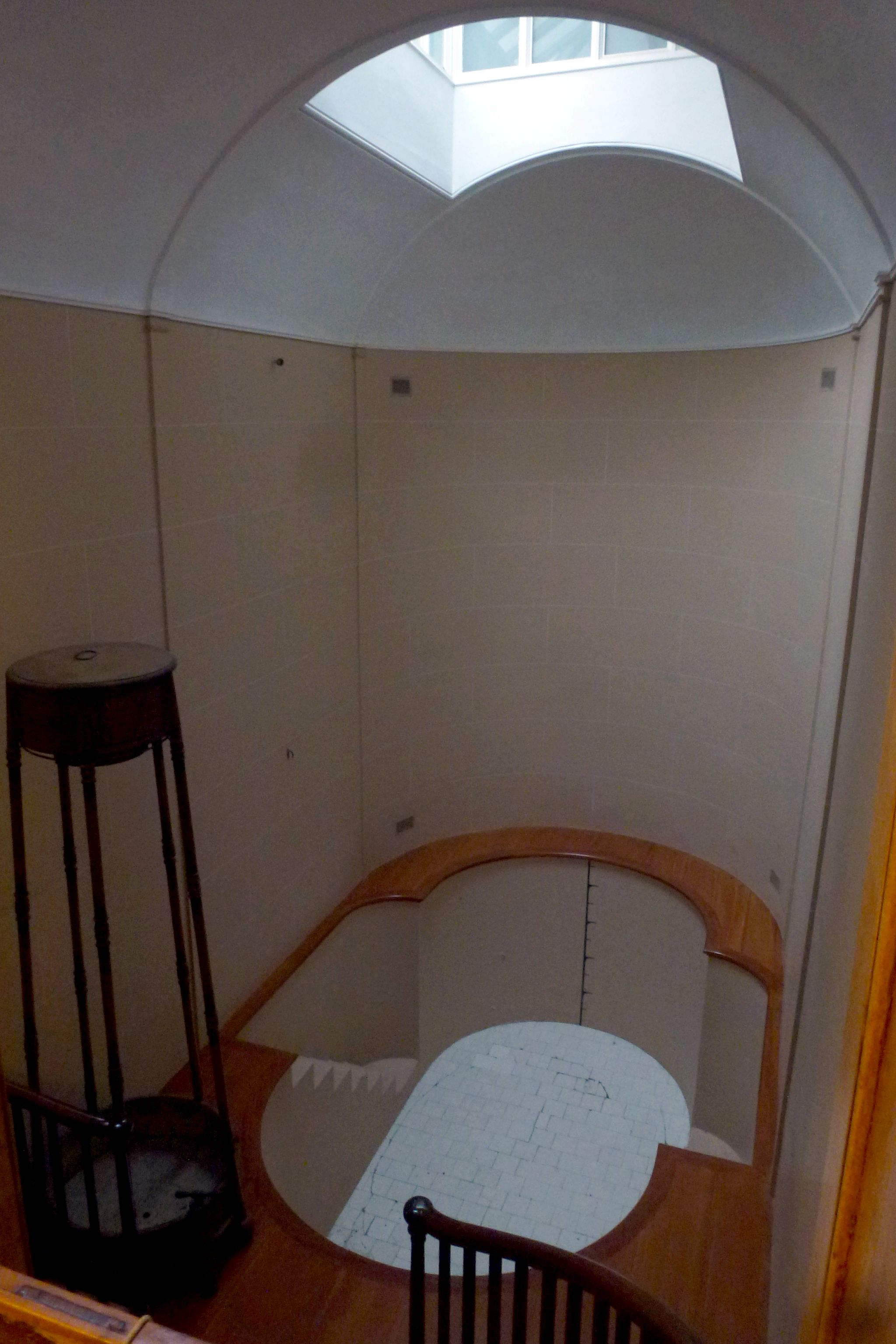
Plunge Pool, Wimpole Hall, 1791–93

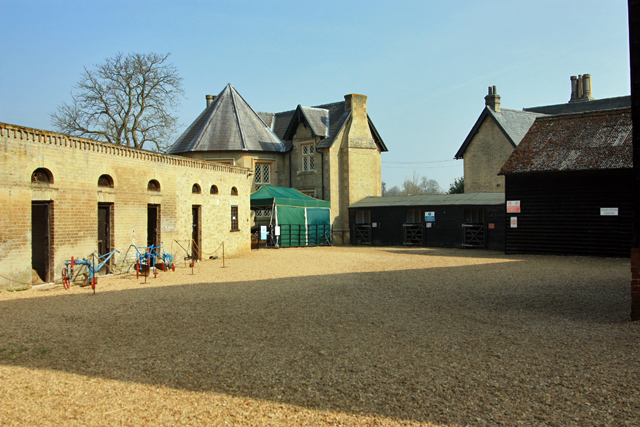
Home Farm, Wimpole Hall, 1793

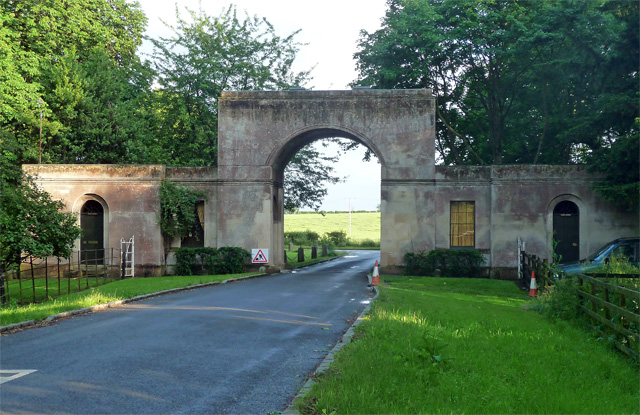
Gatehouse, Tyringham, 1792

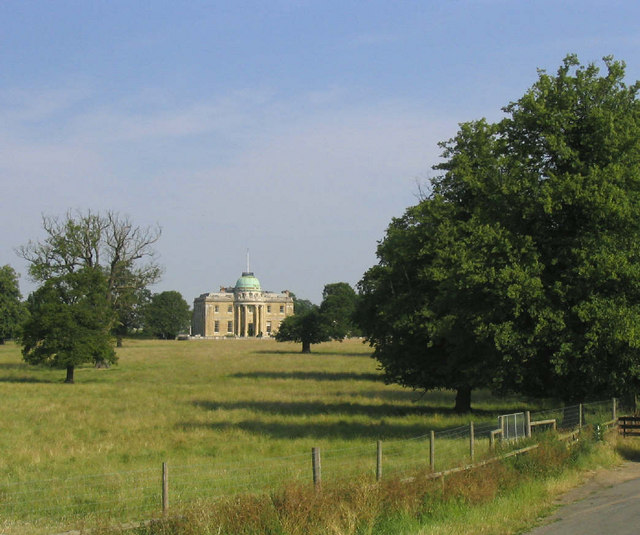
Tyringham Hall, 1793–1800

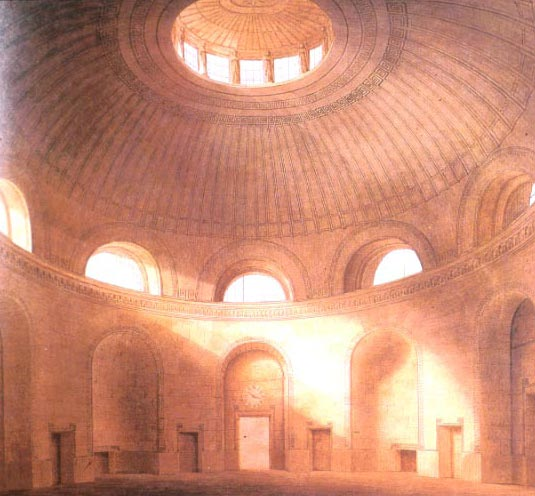
Bank of England rotunda, 1794

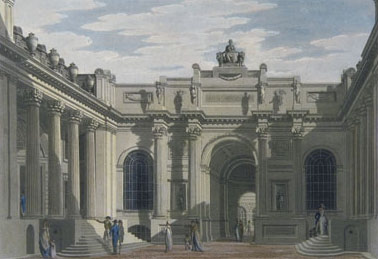
Lothbury Court, Bank of England, 1797–1800

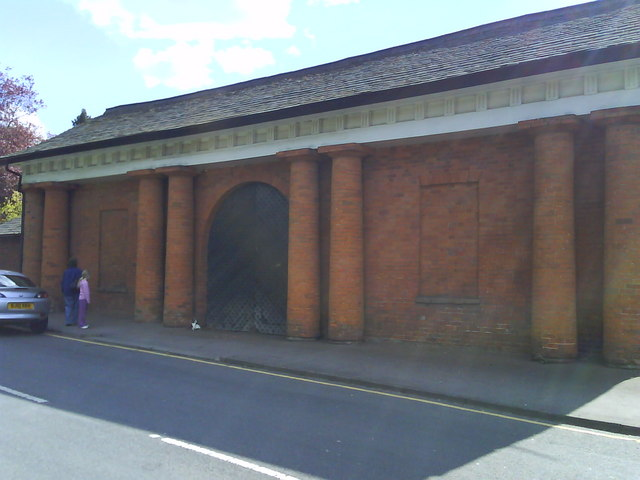
The Barn, Malvern Hall, 1798

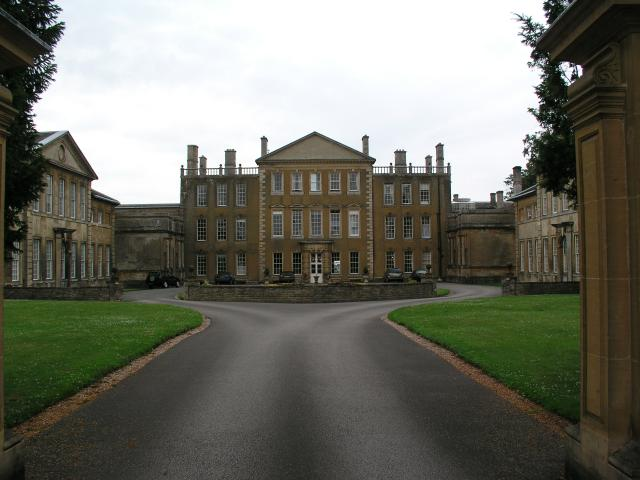
Aynho Park, Northamptonshire, remodelled 1798

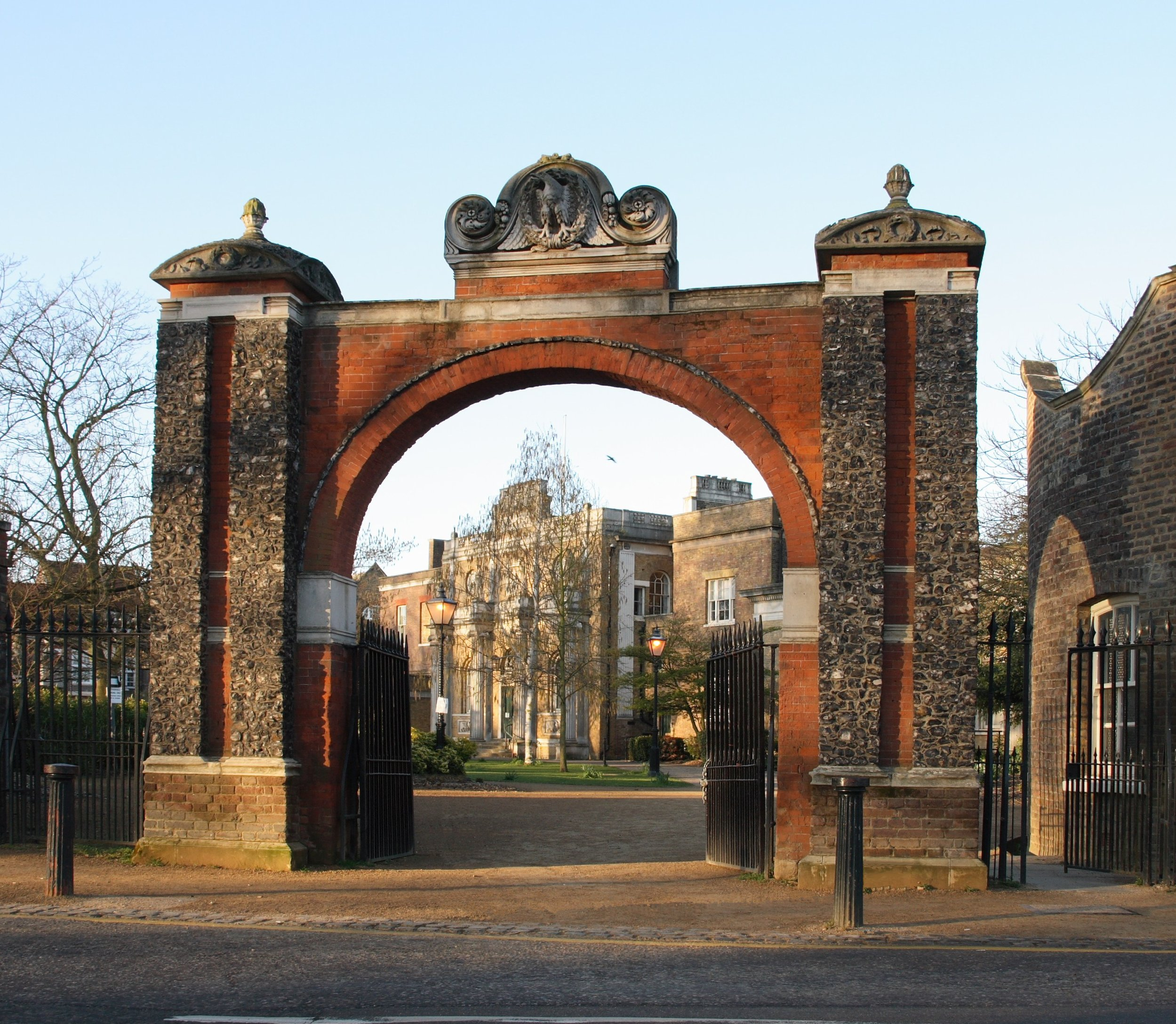
Gateway at Pitzhanger Manor, c.1803

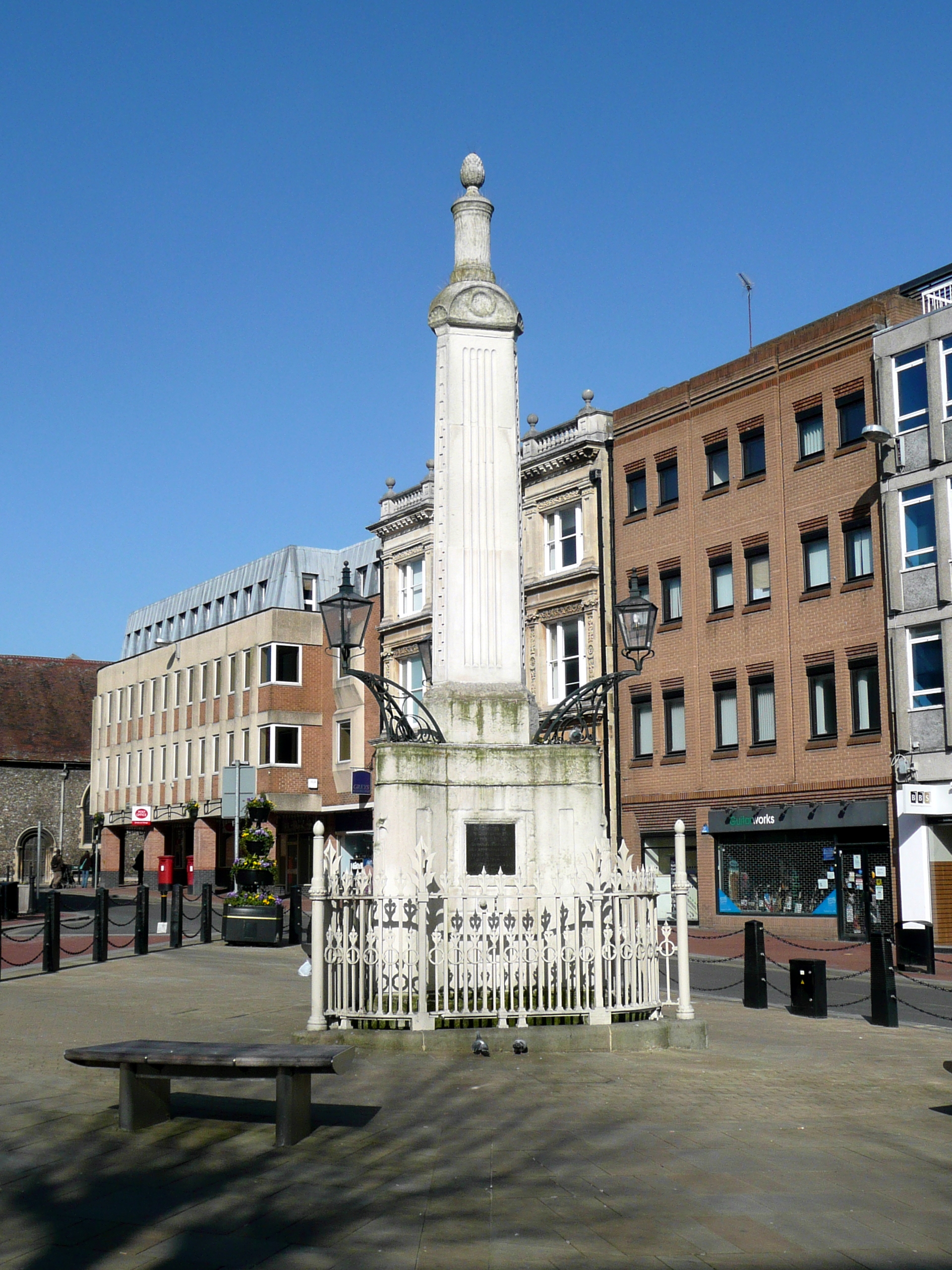
Simeon Monument, Market Place, Reading, 1804

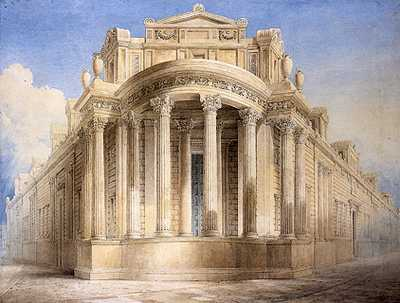
Bank of England 'Tivoli Corner', 1805

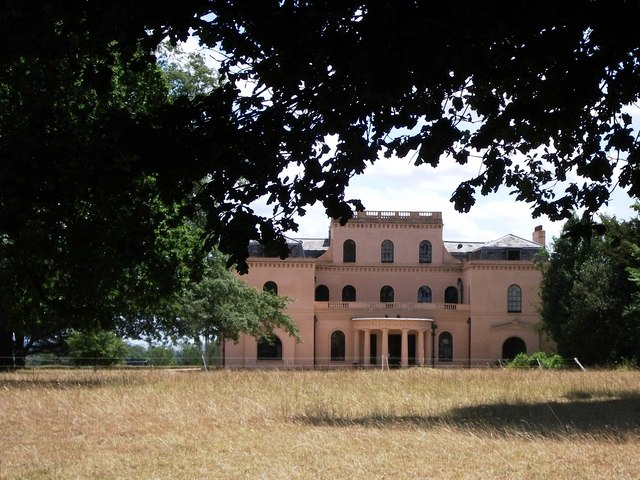
Moggerhanger, entrance front, 1809

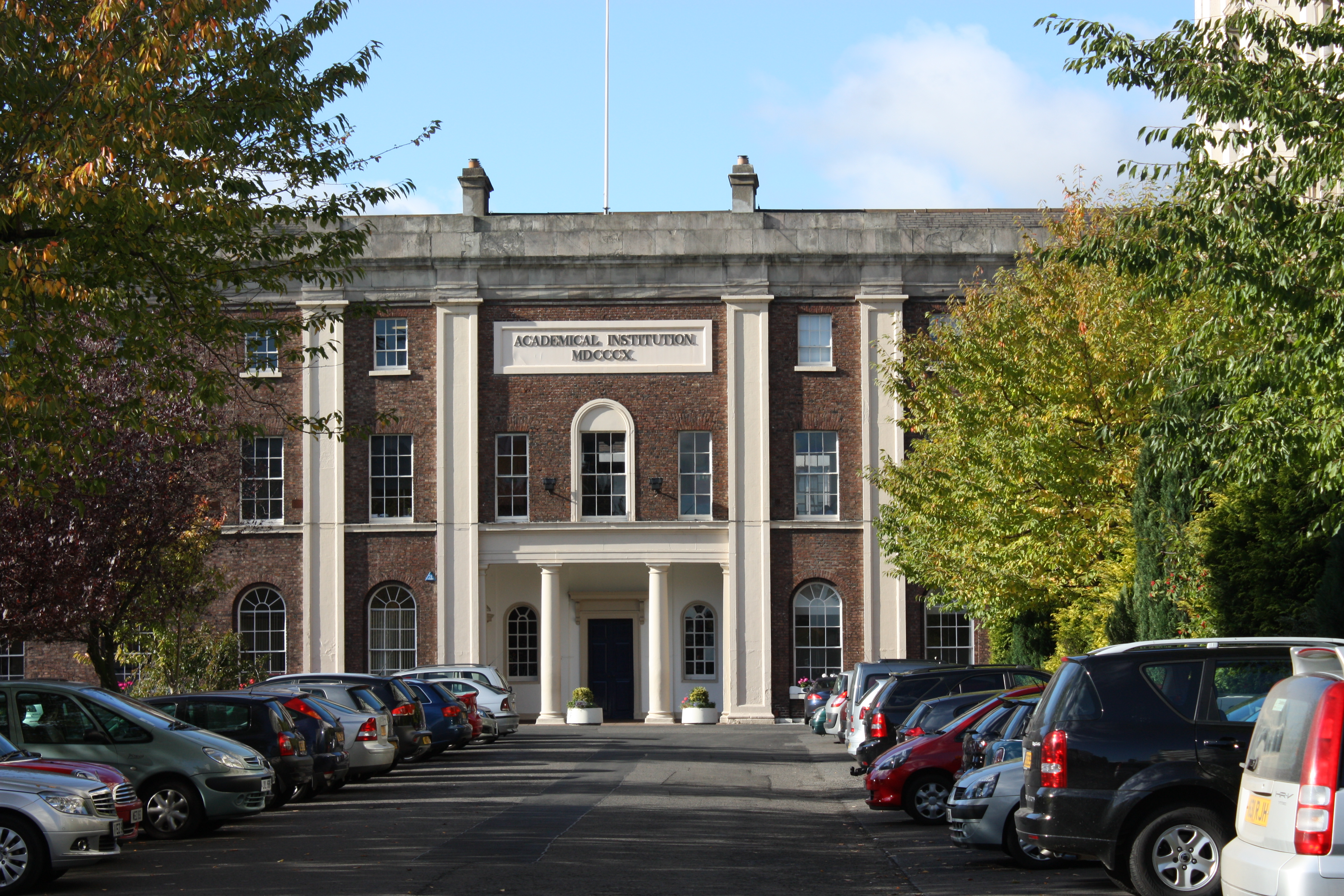
Belfast, Royal Belfast Academical Institution, 1809–14

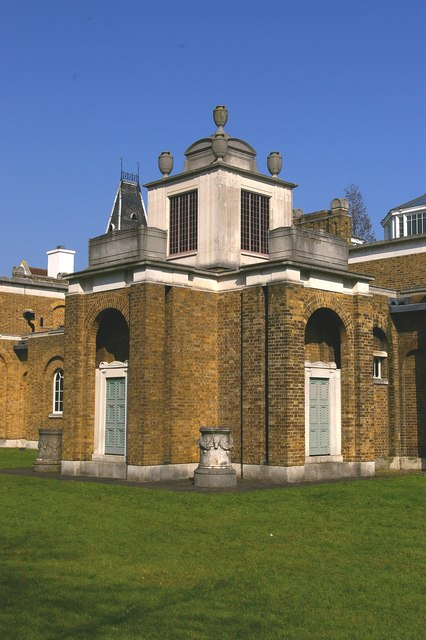
Dulwich Picture Gallery, 1811–17

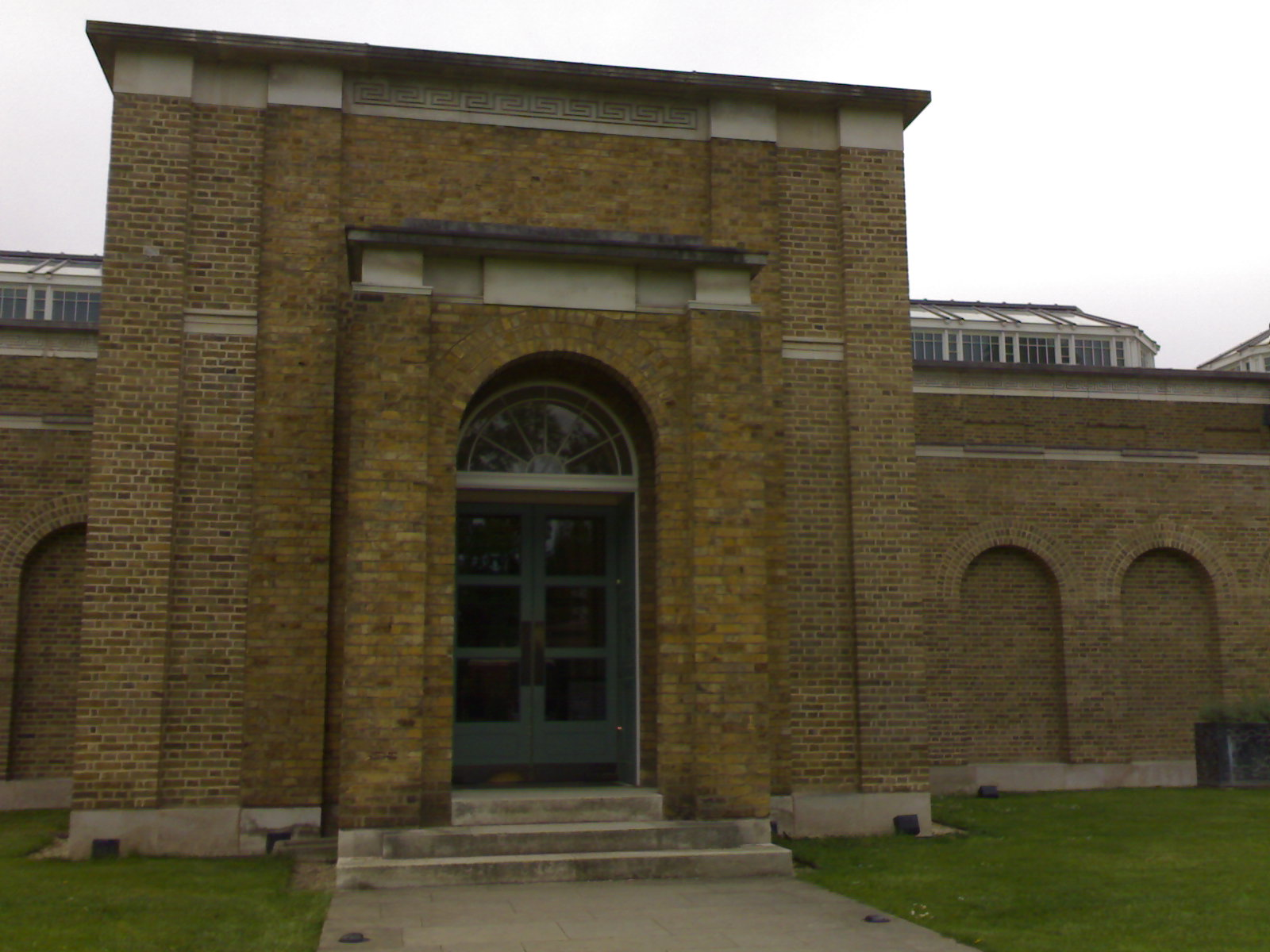
Entrance, Dulwich Picture Gallery, 1811–17

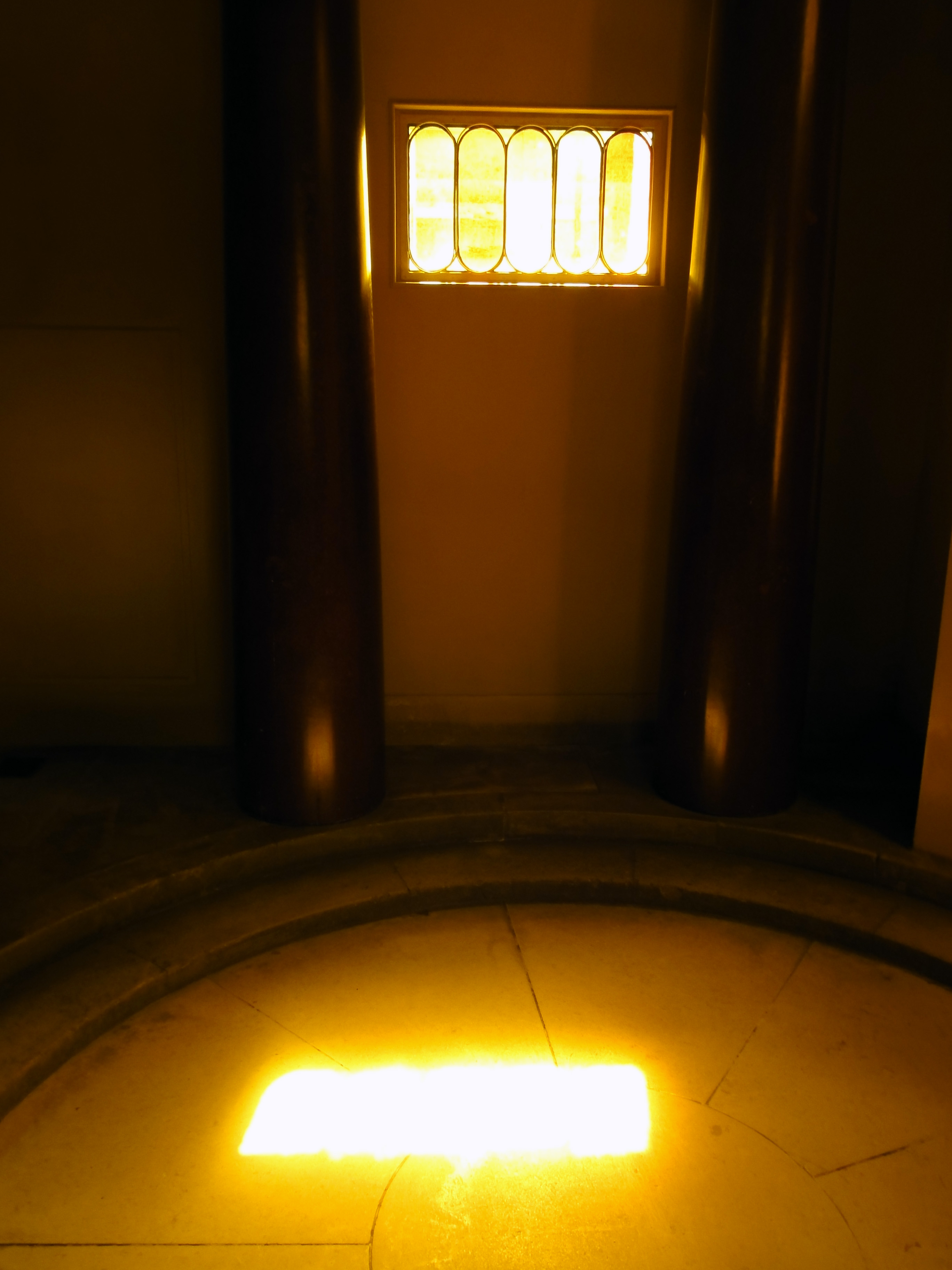
Interior of the Mausoleum, Dulwich Picture Gallery, 1811–17

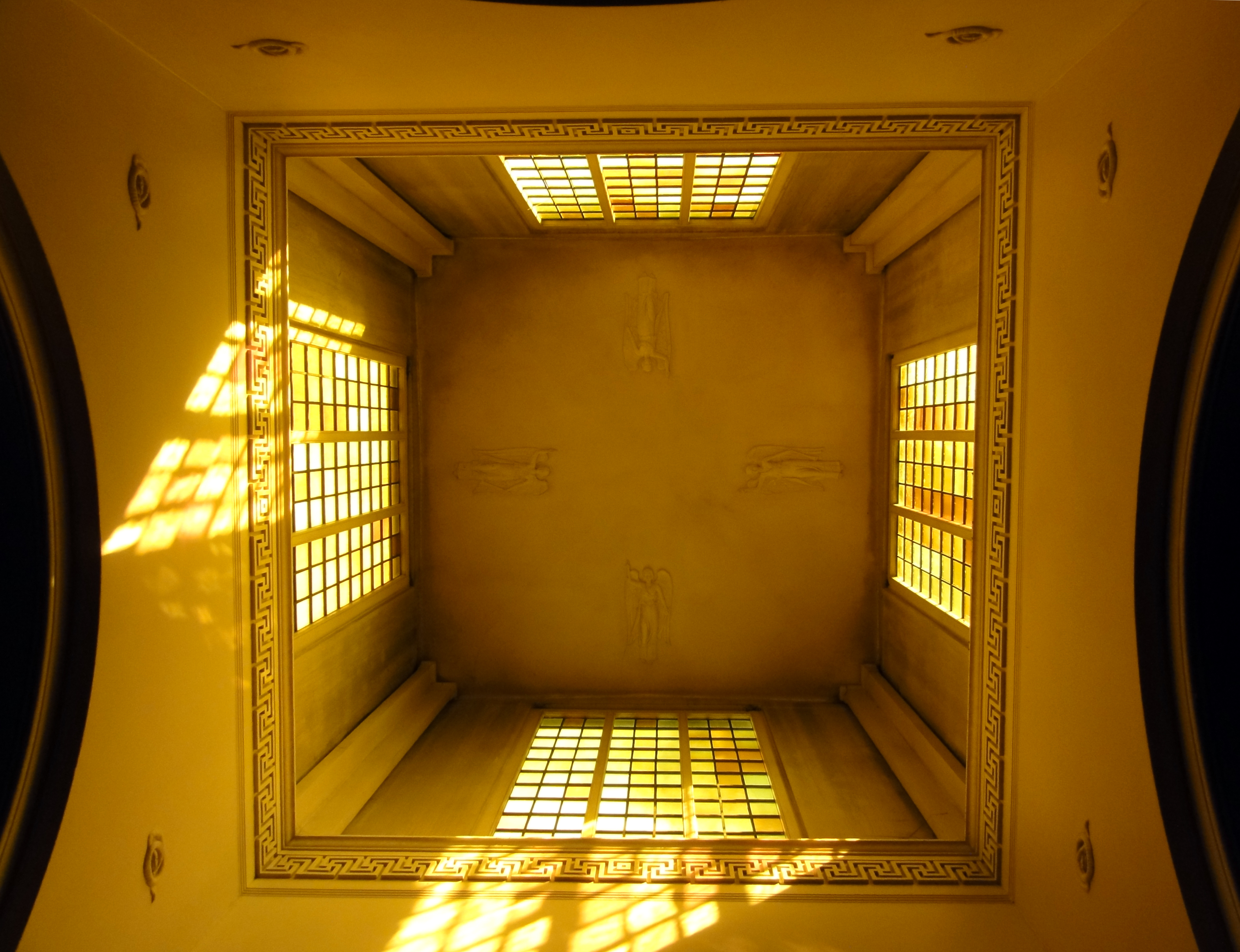
Interior of the lantern of the Mausoleum, Dulwich Picture Gallery, 1811–17

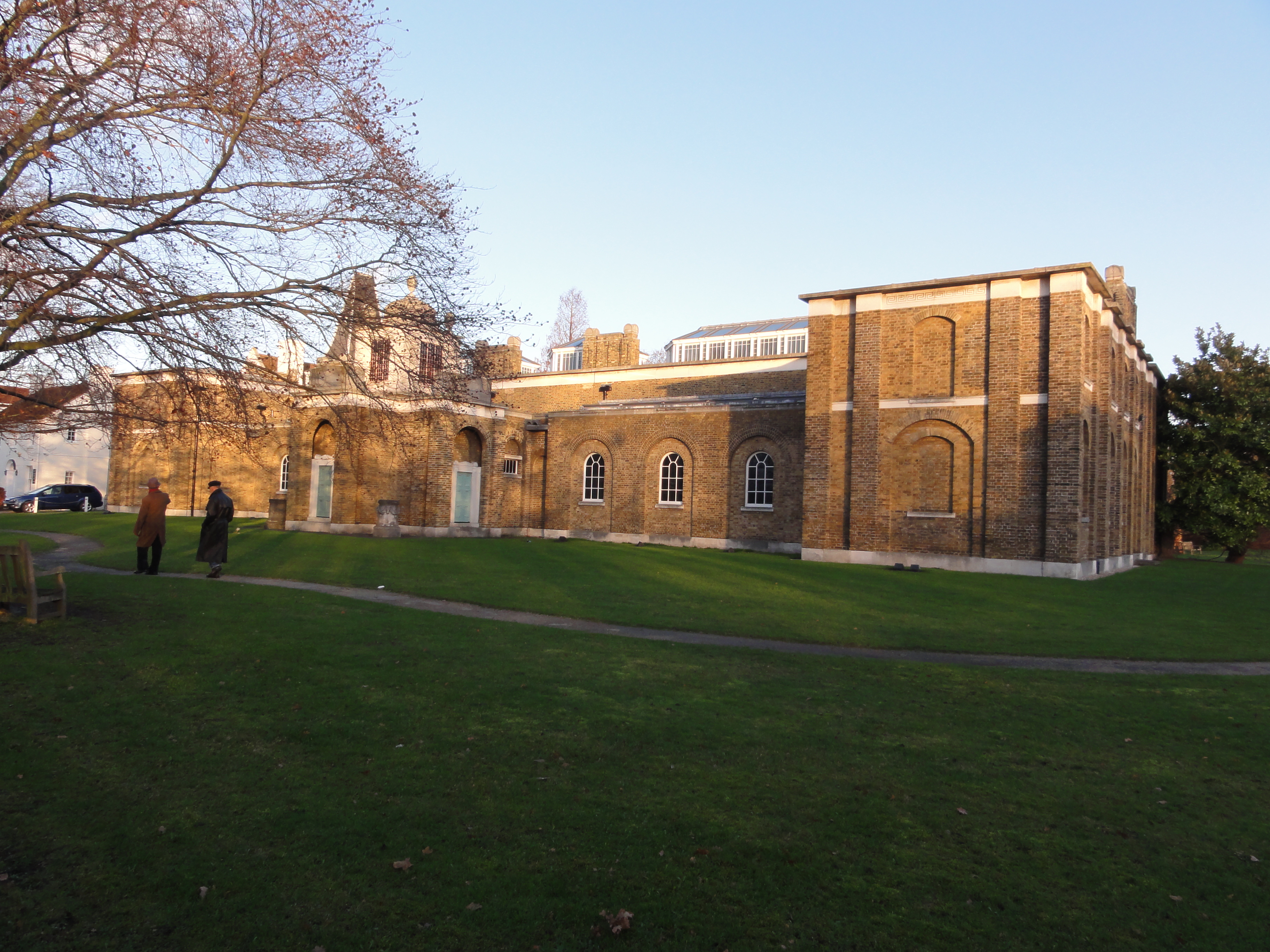
Dulwich Picture Gallery, 1811–17

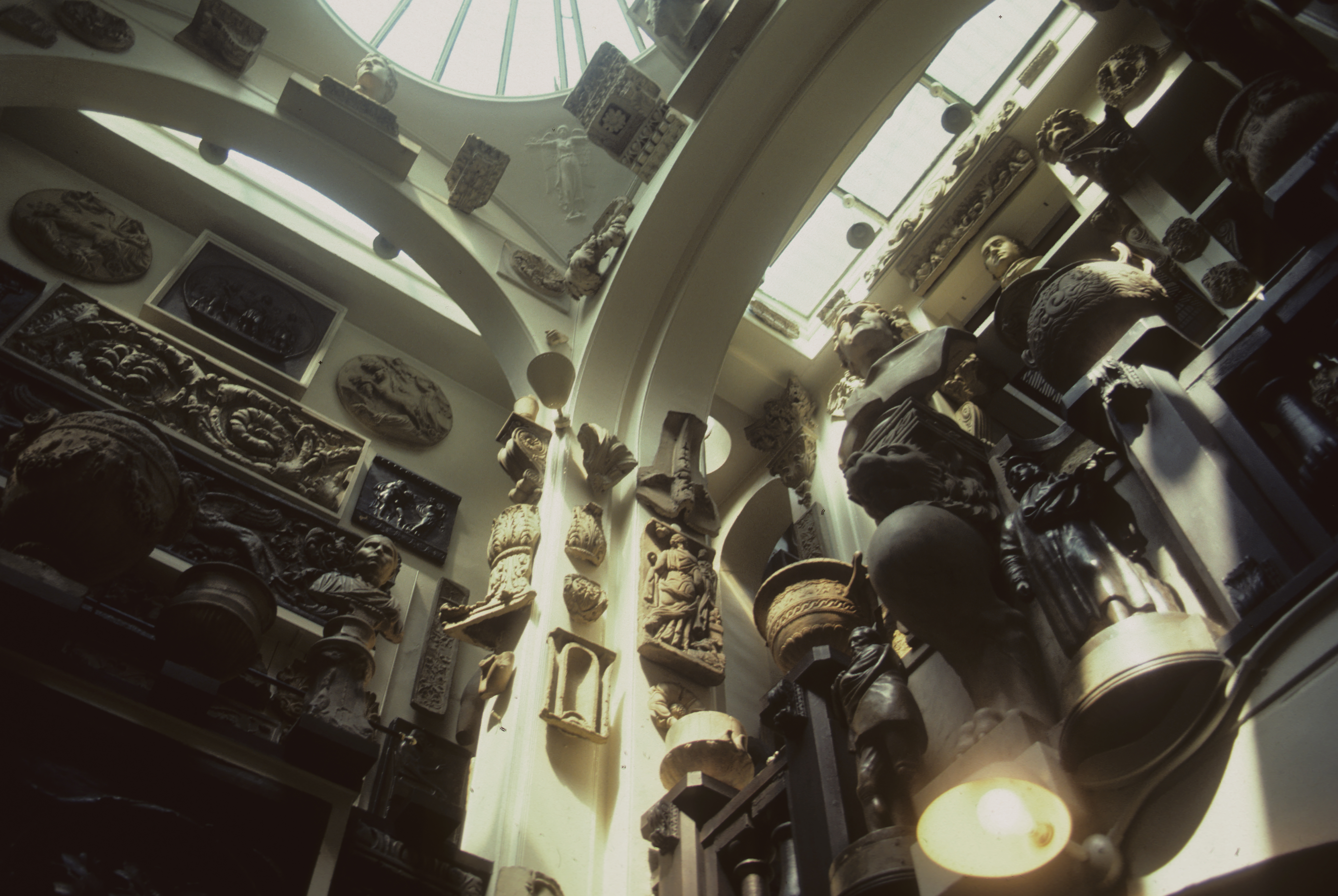
The Dome, Soane Museum, 1813

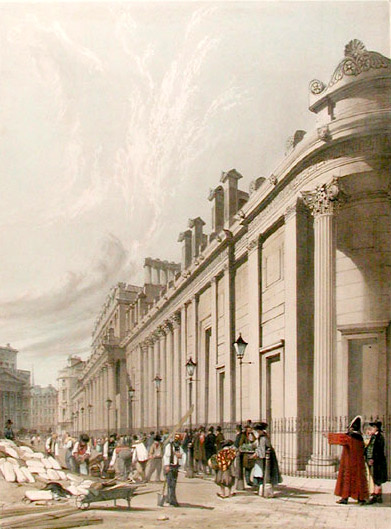
Bank of England, main facade on Threadneedle Street, 1818–27

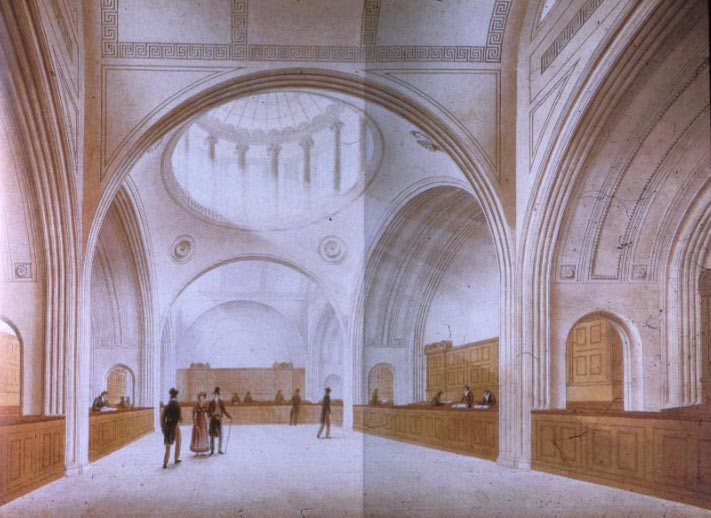
Dividend Office, Bank of England, 1818–27

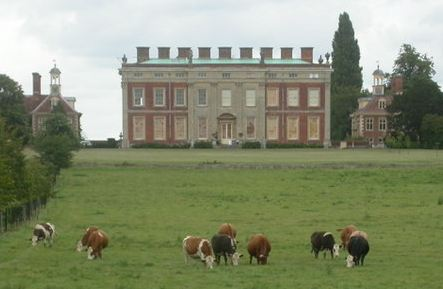
Wotton House, Buckinghamshire, remodelled 1820

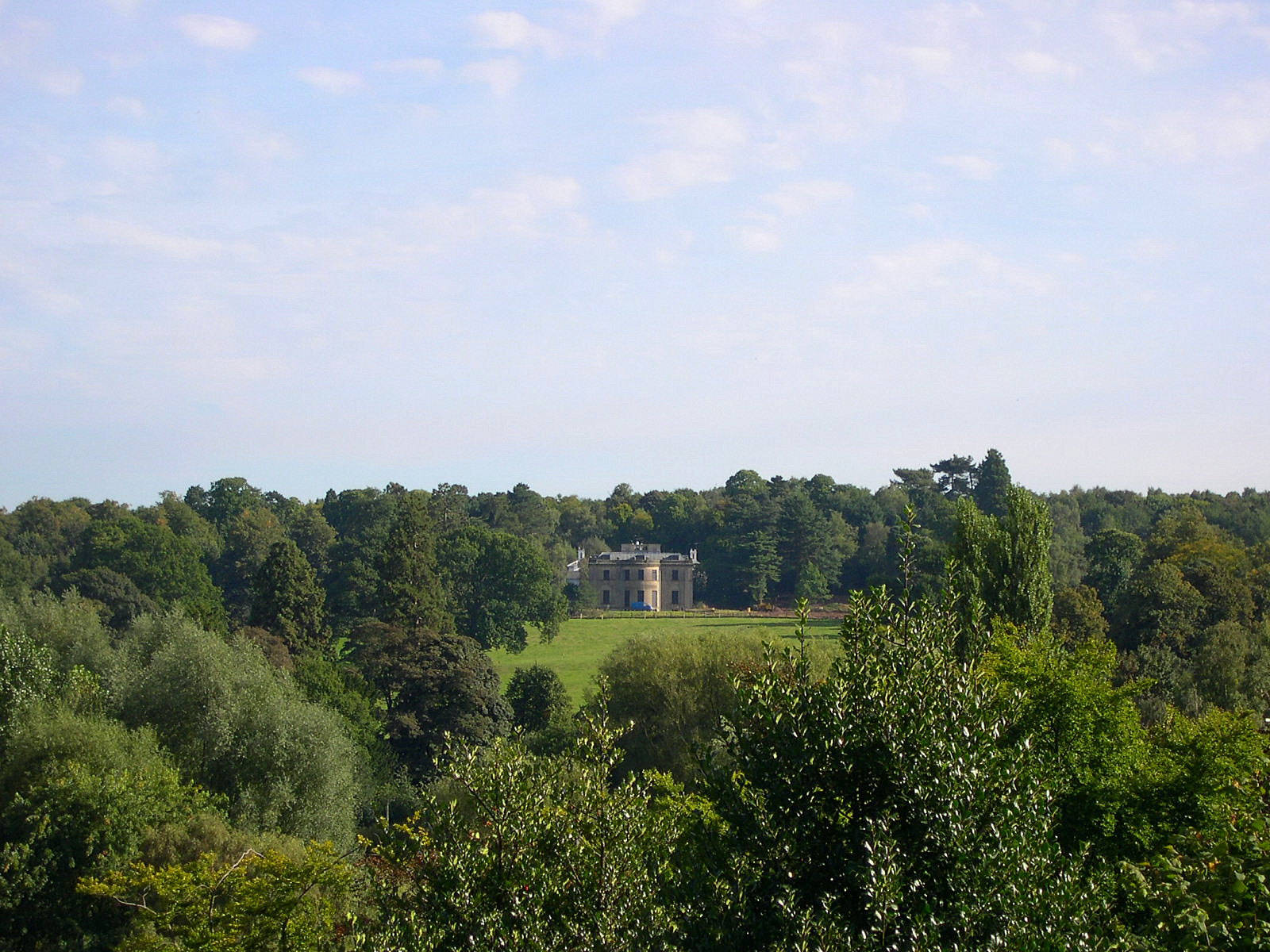
Pellwall House, Staffordshire, 1822

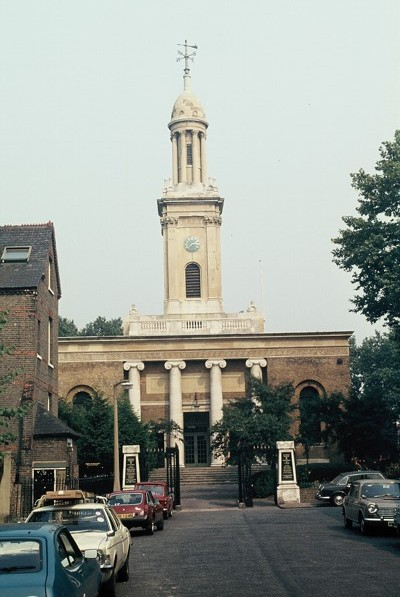
St Peter's Walworth, west front, 1822–23

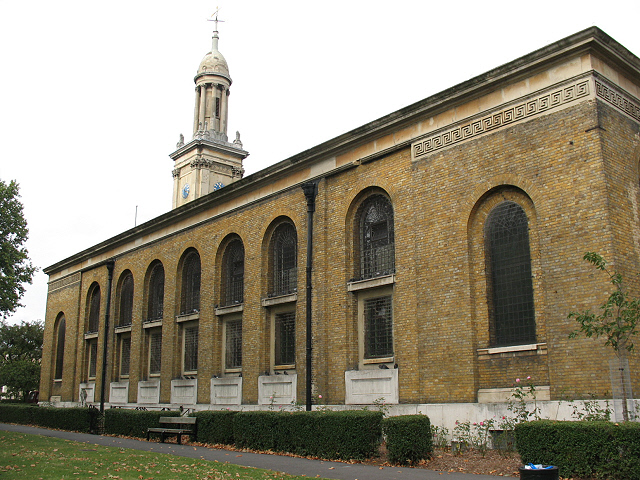
St Peter's Walworth, south side, 1822–23

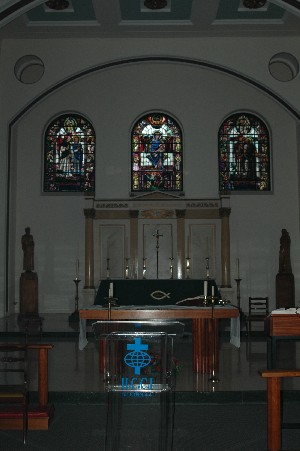
St Peter's Walworth, interior looking east, 1822–23

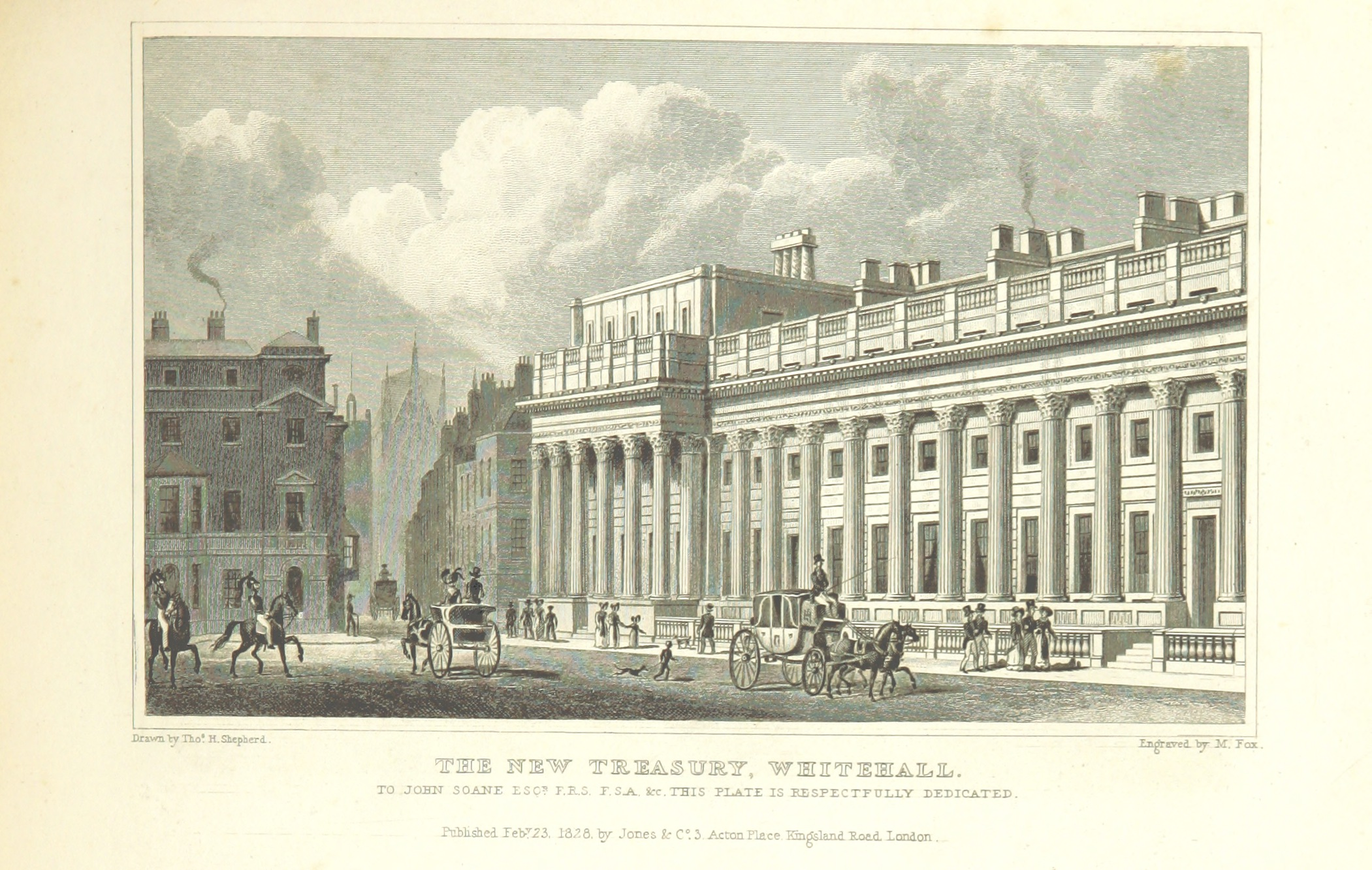
Former Treasury, Whitehall, 1823–24

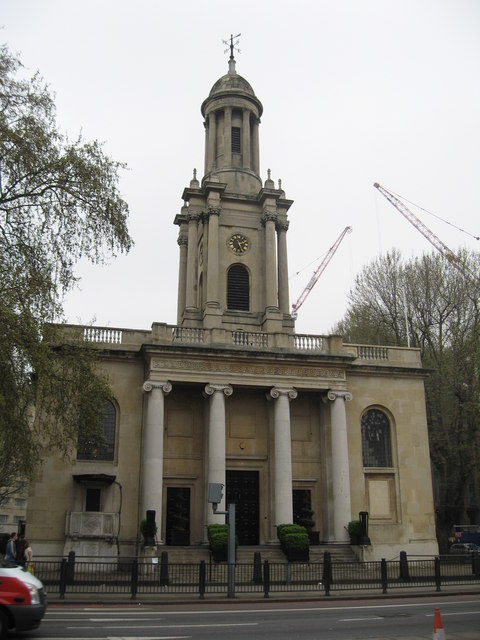
Holy Trinity Church, Marylebone, west front, 1824–26

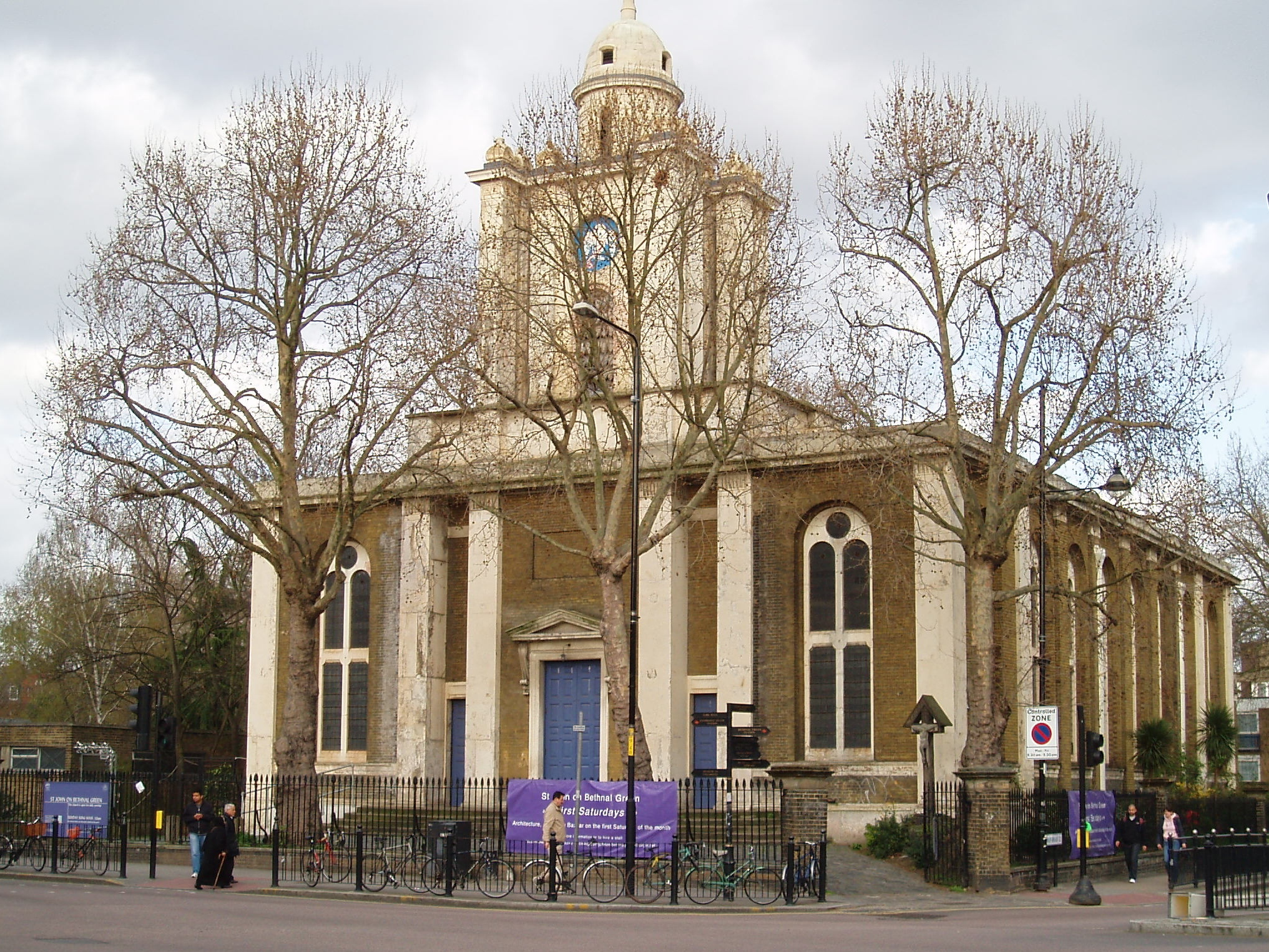
St John, Bethnal Green, 1826–28
- Aynhoe Park, Aynho, Northamptonshire (1799–1804); remodelled the interior
- Bank of England, London (1788–1833)
- Chillington Hall, Staffordshire (1785–89); remodelled.
- Cricket House, Somerset (1794 and 1801–04)
- Dulwich Picture Gallery, London (1811–14)
- Freemasons' Hall, London (1828); demolished 1864.
- Holy Trinity Church, Marylebone (1826–27)
- Honing Hall, Norfolk
- Kelshall Rectory, Hertfordshire (1788)
- Moggerhanger House, Bedfordshire (1809–11)
- Pell Wall Hall, Market Drayton, Shropshire (1822–28)
- Piercefield House, Monmouthshire, Wales (1785–83)
- Pitzhanger Manor, Ealing (1800–03)
- Royal Belfast Academical Institution (1809–14)
- Royal Hospital Chelsea (1809–17)
- Ryston Hall, Norfolk (1780), alterations
- St. John's Church, Bethnal Green (1826–28)
- St Peter's Church, Walworth (1823–24)
- Soane Museum, Lincoln's Inn Fields, a museum (originally Soane's home); various remodellings from 1792 to 1824
- South Hill Park, Berkshire (1801)
- Tyringham Hall, Newport Pagnell, Buckinghamshire (1793–1800)
- Wimpole Hall, Arrington, Royston, Cambridgeshire (1791–93)
- Wokefield Park, Berkshire (1788–89)
- Wotton House, Buckinghamshire (1821–22)
