= Worcestershire County Council elections =

Local government elections in Worcestershire, England

Worcestershire County Council elections are held every four years. Worcestershire County Council is the upper-tier local authority for the non-metropolitan county of Worcestershire in England. Since the last boundary changes in 2025, 57 councillors have been elected from 53 electoral divisions.

== Council elections ==
Year	Conservative	Labour	Liberal Democrats (Note: Includes totals for the predecessors of the Liberal Democrats, the Liberal Party and SDP (both of which participated in the Alliance).)	Reform	Green	Health Concern	UKIP	Independents & Others	Council control after election
Council re-established (57 seats)
1997	25	22	8	–	0	–	0	2 (Note: Including 1 Liberal)	No overall control
2001	26	14	9	–	0	6	0	2 (Note: Including 1 Liberal)	No overall control
New division boundaries
2005	29	17	8	–	0	1	0	2 (Note: 2 Liberals)	Conservative
2009	42	3	8	–	0	2	0	2 (Note: 1 Liberal, 1 Wythall Residents Association)	Conservative
2013	30	12	3	–	2	2	4	4 (Note: Including 1 Liberal, 1 Wythall Residents Association)	Conservative
2017	40	10	3	–	2	1	0	1	Conservative
2021	45	3	4	0	3	0	0	2	Conservative
New division boundaries
2025	12	2	6	27	8	–	0	2	No overall control

== County result maps ==
2005 results map

2009 results map

2013 results map

2017 results map

2021 results map

2025 results map

== By-election results ==
=== 2005–2009 ===
St Chads by-election 12 April 2007
Party	Candidate	Votes	%	±%
Liberal	Graham Ballinger	1,059	50.0	+8.7
Conservative	Tracey Onslow	672	31.8	+9.6
Health Concern	Howard Martin	252	11.9	+2.4
Labour	Dan Watson	133	6.3	−13.9
Majority		387	18.3	
Turnout		2,116		
Liberal hold		Swing		

Arrow Valley East by-election 17 July 2008
Party	Candidate	Votes	%	±%
Conservative	Juliet Brunner	1,437	42.2	+9.9
Labour	Debbie Taylor	1,041	30.6	−15.8
Liberal Democrats	Diane Thomas	455	13.4	−7.9
BNP	Maurice Field	367	10.8	+10.8
Independent	Richard Armstrong	103	3.0	+3.0
Majority		396	11.6	
Turnout		3,403		
Conservative gain from Labour		Swing		

=== 2009–2013 ===
Bowbrook by-election 25 November 2010
Party	Candidate	Votes	%	±%
Conservative	Tony Miller	1,088	59.2	−1.2
Liberal Democrats	Margaret Rowley	536	29.2	+7.2
Labour	Chris Barton	213	11.6	+4.6
Majority		552	30.0	
Turnout		1,837		
Conservative hold		Swing		

Alvechurch by-election 16 December 2010
Party	Candidate	Votes	%	±%
Conservative	June Griffiths	637	52.6	+11.6
Labour	Christopher Bloore	189	15.6	+6.3
Independent	Dee Morton	157	13.0	+13.0
Liberal Democrats	Howard Allen	83	6.9	−6.3
Independent	Kenneth Wheatley	79	6.5	+6.5
UKIP	Steven Morson	65	5.4	−16.6
Majority		448	37.0	
Turnout		1,210		
Conservative hold		Swing		

=== 2013–2017 ===
Stourport-on-Severn by-election 27 June 2013
Party	Candidate	Votes	%	±%
Health Concern	John Thomas	1,055	30.6	+4.1
UKIP	John Holden	892	25.8	−1.7
Conservative	Chris Rogers	753	21.8	+2.3
Labour	Carol Warren	607	17.6	−5.0
Green	Angela Hartwich	77	2.2	−1.7
BNP	Carl Mason	39	1.1	+1.1
Liberal Democrats	Paul Preston	30	0.9	+0.9
Majority		163	4.7	
Turnout		3,453		
Health Concern gain from UKIP		Swing		

St Marys by-election 1 August 2013
Party	Candidate	Votes	%	±%
Conservative	Nathan Desmond	504	28.0	+2.9
UKIP	Peter Willoughby	442	24.6	−2.8
Labour	Mumshad Ahmed	338	18.8	−4.6
Health Concern	Graham Ballinger	321	17.8	+2.3
Independent	Helen Dyke	195	10.8	+10.8
Majority		62	3.4	
Turnout		1,800		
Conservative gain from UKIP		Swing		

Arrow Valley East by-election 22 May 2014
Party	Candidate	Votes	%	±%
UKIP	Peter Bridle	2,017	35.2	+1.2
Labour	Phil Mould	1,601	28.0	−1.3
Conservative	Juliet Brunner	1,448	25.3	+3.0
Liberal Democrats	Simon Oliver	286	5.0	+1.2
Green	Emma Bradley	241	4.2	+0.6
Independent	Isabel Armstrong	133	2.3	+2.3
Majority		416	7.3	
Turnout		5,726		
UKIP hold		Swing		

Stourport-on-Severn by-election 17 December 2015
Party	Candidate	Votes	%	±%
Conservative	Tony Muir	763	28.7	+9.2
Health Concern	Nicky Martin	725	27.3	+0.8
Labour	Jill Hawes	581	21.9	−0.7
UKIP	John Holden	547	20.6	−6.1
Green	Phil Oliver	42	1.6	−2.3
Majority		38	1.4	
Turnout		2,658		
Conservative gain from Health Concern		Swing		

Ombersley by-election 11 August 2016
Party	Candidate	Votes	%	±%
Conservative	Robert Tomlinson	956	63.2	+15.2
Liberal Democrats	Peter Evans	224	14.8	+8.8
UKIP	Richard Keel	212	14.0	−19.2
Independent	Douglas Ingram	120	7.9	N/A
Majority		732	48.4	
Turnout		1,518	18.00	
Conservative hold		Swing		

=== 2017–2021 ===
Bromsgrove South by-election 31 October 2019
Party	Candidate	Votes	%	±%
Conservative	Kyle Daisley	769	40.2	−0.3
Independent	Rachel Jenkins	436	22.8	+22.8
Liberal Democrats	Joshua Robinson	357	18.7	+13.8
Labour	Bren Henderson	351	18.3	−32.2
Majority		333	17.4	
Turnout		1,913		
Conservative gain from Labour		Swing		

=== 2021–2025 ===
Arrow Valley West by-election 1 September 2022
Party	Candidate	Votes	%	±%
Labour	Andrew Fry	1,342	53.7	
Conservative	Gemma Monaco	893	35.7	
Green	Glen Theobald	146	5.8	
Liberal Democrats	Mark Tomes	120	4.8	
Majority		449	18.0	
Turnout		2,501	15.87	
Labour gain from Conservative		Swing		

Malvern Chase by-election 4 May 2023
Party	Candidate	Votes	%	±%
Green	Malcolm Victory	740	25.4	+25.4
Conservative	David Watkins	737	25.3	−6.3
Liberal Democrats	Pete Benkwitz	684	23.5	−13.9
Labour	Martin Willis	388	13.3	+5.0
MH Independents	Sarah Rouse	364	12.5	+12.5
Majority		3	0.1	
Turnout		2,913		
Green gain from Liberal Democrats		Swing		

Warndon Parish by-election 19 October 2023
Party	Candidate	Votes	%	±%
Green	Andrew Cross	1,139	44.1	+28.6
Conservative	Lucy Hodgson	623	24.1	−37.0
Liberal Democrats	Sarah Murray	579	22.4	+16.2
Labour	Robyn Norfolk	239	9.3	−7.4
Majority		516	20.0	
Turnout		2,580		
Green gain from Conservative		Swing		

Evesham North West by-election 2 May 2024
Party	Candidate	Votes	%	±%
Conservative	Mark Goodge	655	33.0	−27.5
Labour	David Tasker	453	22.8	−1.4
Liberal Democrats	Oliver Walker	245	12.3	+3.5
Independent	John Campbell-Muir	237	11.9	+11.9
Green	Stephen Squires	205	10.3	+10.3
Independent	Peter Scurfield	191	9.6	+9.6
Majority		202	10.2	
Turnout		1,986		
Conservative hold		Swing		

=== 2025–2029 ===
Bromsgrove South by-election 1 September 2025
Party	Candidate	Votes	%	±%
Liberal Democrats	Sam Ammar	1,416	51.9	+20.3
Reform	Philip Hingley	911	33.4	−1.5
Conservative	Matt Dormer	309	11.3	−5.8
Labour	Laura Rollins	92	3.4	−4.1
Majority		505	18.5	
Turnout		2,728		
Liberal Democrats gain from Reform		Swing		

== See also ==
- Hereford and Worcester County Council elections
