= 2025 Worcestershire County Council election =

2025 English local election

- 1 May 2025

All 57 seats to Worcestershire County Council 29 seats needed for a majority
	First party	Second party	Third party
Leader	Joanne Monk	Simon Geraghty (defeated)	Matt Jenkins
Party	Reform	Conservative	Green
Last election	0 seats, 0.4%	45 seats, 49.6%	3 seats, 10.4%
Seats before	2	37	5
Seats won	27	12	8
Seat change	▲27	▼33	▲5
Popular vote	56,859	46,349	24,486
Percentage	31.6%	25.7%	13.6%
Swing	▲31.2 pp	▼23.9 pp	▲3.2 pp
	Fourth party	Fifth party	Sixth party
Leader	Mel Allcott (Note: Mel Allcott leads the "Unity Group", which comprises both Liberal Democrat and Labour councillors. Allcott herself is a Liberal Democrat.)	Richard Udall	N/A
Party	Liberal Democrats	Labour	Independent
Last election	4 seats, 10.2%	3 seats, 19.8%	2 seats, 7.4%
Seats before	3	5	5 (Note: Tom Wells, an independent, sits with the Greens as part of the "Green And Independent Alliance Group".)
Seats won	6	2	2
Seat change	▲2	▼1	Steady
Popular vote	21,730	22,372	7,425
Percentage	12.1%	12.4%	4.1%
Swing	▲1.9 pp	▼7.3 pp	▼3.3 pp
- Winner of each seat at the 2025 Worcestershire County Council election
Leader before election
Simon Geraghty
Conservative
Leader after election
Jo Monk
Reform UK
No overall control

The 2025 Worcestershire County Council election took place on 1 May 2025 to elect members to Worcestershire County Council in Worcestershire, England as part of the 2025 UK local elections. All 57 seats were elected. The council was under Conservative majority control prior to the election. The election resulted in no overall control, with Reform UK emerging as the largest party and forming a minority administration led by Jo Monk. In May 2026, Matt Jenkins of the Green and Independent Alliance became leader with the support of the Conservative, Liberal Democrat and Worcestershire Independent groups. In July 2026, the government confirmed that the county council would be replaced by two unitary authorities in April 2028, with elections to shadow authorities planned for May 2027.

== Background ==
In the 2021 election, the Conservatives won 45 seats, giving them a majority and control of the council. The Liberal Democrats won 4 seats, while Labour and the Greens each won 3 seats. Two seats were won by independent candidates: Beverley Nielsen in Malvern Langland and Tom Wells in Powick.

New boundaries were introduced for the 2025 election following an electoral review. The number of councillors remained 57, but the number of divisions increased from 52 to 53.

== Previous council composition ==
After 2021 election		Before 2025 election	
Party	Seats	Party	Seats
Conservative	45	Conservative	37
Green	3	Green	5
Labour	3	Labour	5
Liberal Democrats	4	Liberal Democrats	3
Reform	0	Reform	2
Independent	2	Independent	5

== Summary ==
The Conservatives lost the majority they had held for 20 years, and the leader of the council, Simon Geraghty, lost his seat. Reform UK were the largest party, but were two seats short of a majority. Reform chose Jo Monk as its group leader after the election. Monk had been elected as a Conservative in 2021 but defected to Reform in March 2025. She was formally appointed leader of the council at the subsequent annual council meeting on 22 May 2025, leading a minority administration. In May 2026, Reform's minority administration was replaced by a cross-party alliance of Conservatives, Greens, Liberal Democrats and independent councillors, with Green councillor Matt Jenkins becoming leader. The national Conservative Party subsequently suspended the leader of its council group, Adam Kent, for taking part in the agreement.

=== Election result ===
2025 Worcestershire County Council election
Party	Candidates	Seats	Gains	Losses	Net gain/loss	Seats %	Votes %	Votes	+/−
Reform	57	27	{{{gain}}}	{{{loss}}}	▲27	47.4	31.6	56,859	+31.2
Conservative	57	12	{{{gain}}}	{{{loss}}}	▼33	21.1	25.7	46,349	–23.9
Green	56	8	{{{gain}}}	{{{loss}}}	▲5	14.0	13.6	24,486	+3.2
Liberal Democrats	57	6	{{{gain}}}	{{{loss}}}	▲2	10.5	12.1	21,730	+1.9
Labour	57	2	{{{gain}}}	{{{loss}}}	▼1	3.5	12.4	22,372	-7.3
Independent	14	2	{{{gain}}}	{{{loss}}}	Steady	3.5	4.1	7,425	–3.3
Liberal	2	0	{{{gain}}}	{{{loss}}}	Steady	0.0	0.4	755	N/A
TUSC	2	0	{{{gain}}}	{{{loss}}}	Steady	0.0	<0.1	42	–0.1
UKIP	1	0	{{{gain}}}	{{{loss}}}	Steady	0.0	<0.1	19	N/A
Heritage	1	0	{{{gain}}}	{{{loss}}}	Steady	0.0	<0.1	16	N/A

== Division results by district ==
=== Bromsgrove ===
Bromsgrove district summary
Party	Seats	+/-	Votes	%	+/-
Reform UK	4	▲4	8,094	29.3	+29.1
Conservative	2	▼5	7,885	28.5	–20.1
Liberal Democrats	2	▲1	5,029	18.2	+6.9
Independent	1	▲1	2,958	10.7	–2.7
Labour	0	▼1	2,438	8.8	–11.9
Green	0	Steady	1,267	4.6	–1.3
Total	9		27,671		

Division results

Alvechurch
Party	Candidate	Votes	%	±%
Independent	Alan Bailes	1,026	34.5	–4.8
Conservative	Danny Bromage	751	25.2	–19.8
Reform	Lisa Cresswell	674	22.6	N/A
Labour	Douglas Bridger	233	7.8	–2.4
Green	John Ball	156	5.2	–0.3
Liberal Democrats	Gillian Bell	138	4.6	N/A
Majority		275	9.2	N/A
Turnout		2,978		
Independent gain from Conservative		Swing	▲7.5	

Beacon
Party	Candidate	Votes	%	±%
Reform	Peter Turner	956	33.6	N/A
Conservative	Anita Dale	742	26.1	–12.3
Labour	Peter McDonald	711	25.0	–10.3
Green	Jill Harvey	251	8.8	+2.3
Liberal Democrats	Sara Woodhouse	183	6.4	+4.5
Majority		214	7.5	N/A
Turnout		2,843		
Reform gain from Conservative				

Bromsgrove Central
Party	Candidate	Votes	%	±%
Liberal Democrats	Joshua Robinson*	1,715	47.6	+5.7
Reform	Chris Thomas	1,030	28.6	N/A
Conservative	Adrian Kriss	548	15.2	–20.3
Labour	David Hopkins	197	5.5	–8.6
Green	Peter Measham	114	3.2	–1.8
Majority		685	19.0	N/A
Turnout		3,604		
Liberal Democrats hold				

Bromsgrove East
Party	Candidate	Votes	%	±%
Liberal Democrats	Samuel Evans	1,141	38.6	+13.0
Conservative	Kit Taylor*	733	24.8	–29.0
Reform	Bob Waller	722	24.4	N/A
Labour	John Cochrane	169	5.7	−7.8
Independent	Charlie Hotham	103	3.5	N/A
Green	Peter Harvey	91	3.1	–4.1
Majority		408	13.8	N/A
Turnout		2,959		
Liberal Democrats gain from Conservative		Swing	▲21.0	

Bromsgrove South
Party	Candidate	Votes	%	±%
Reform	Gaynor Jean-Louis	967	34.9	N/A
Liberal Democrats	Sam Ammar	878	31.6	+11.8
Conservative	Helen Jones	474	17.1	–33.9
Labour	Ian Woodall	208	7.5	–14.9
Green	Christopher Cooke	154	5.6	–1.3
Independent	Kyle Daisley*	94	3.4	N/A
Majority		89	3.2	N/A
Turnout		2,775		
Reform gain from Conservative				

Bromsgrove West
Party	Candidate	Votes	%	±%
Reform	Nik Price	754	37.1	N/A
Liberal Democrats	James Clarke	502	24.7	+19.0
Labour	Esther Gray	316	15.6	–46.9
Conservative	Rita Dent	257	12.7	–14.3
Green	John Smout	203	10.0	+5.1
Majority		252	12.4	N/A
Turnout		2,032		
Reform gain from Labour				

Clent Hills
Party	Candidate	Votes	%	±%
Conservative	Karen May*	1,501	39.5	–12.3
Independent	Steven Colella	1,129	29.7	–6.2
Reform	Donna Westwood	768	20.2	+19.2
Labour Co-op	Laura Rollins	165	4.3	–1.2
Liberal Democrats	David Nicholl	135	3.5	+1.7
Green	Stuart Davies	69	1.8	–2.3
Independent	Stan Francis	36	0.9	N/A
Majority		372	9.8	–6.1
Turnout		3,803		
Conservative hold		Swing	▼3.1	

Woodvale
Party	Candidate	Votes	%	±%
Reform	Mark Dunkley	1,319	43.6	N/A
Conservative	Shirley Webb*	1,047	34.6	–31.6
Labour	Sheridan Bellingham	263	8.7	–10.5
Liberal Democrats	Martin German	245	8.1	+2.5
Green	Julian Gray	152	5.0	–4.0
Majority		272	9.0	N/A
Turnout		3,026		
Reform gain from Conservative				

Wythall
Party	Candidate	Votes	%	±%
Conservative	Adam Kent*	1,832	50.2	–21.4
Reform	Stephen Peters	904	24.8	N/A
Independent	Sean Taylor	570	15.6	N/A
Labour	Adrian Lee	176	4.8	–5.6
Liberal Democrats	Valerie Clarke	92	2.5	+0.2
Green	Amelia Quirk	77	2.1	–2.7
Majority		928	25.4	–35.5
Turnout		3,651		
Conservative hold				

=== Malvern Hills ===
Malvern Hills district summary
Party	Seats	+/-	Votes	%	+/-
Green	3	▲1	6,463	26.8	+12.0
Liberal Democrats	2	▲1	2,914	12.1	–1.0
Reform UK	1	▲1	5,440	22.6	+21.9
Conservative	1	▼2	5,248	21.8	–15.6
Independent	1	▼1	2,194	9.1	–16.5
Labour	0	Steady	1,845	7.7	–0.8
Total	8	Steady	24,104		

Division results

Croome
Party	Candidate	Votes	%	±%
Green	Martin Allen*	2,027	63.5	+8.6
Reform	Russ Varley	575	18.0	N/A
Conservative	Sarah McDermott	497	15.6	–24.1
Liberal Democrats	John Drage	54	1.7	–0.6
Labour	Juma Begum	38	1.2	–1.9
Majority		1,452	45.5	+30.3
Turnout		3,191		
Green hold				

Hallow
Party	Candidate	Votes	%	±%
Conservative	Mel Fordington	858	30.1	–15.2
Reform	Sebastian Spiers	816	28.7	N/A
Labour Co-op	Daniel Walton	735	25.8	+18.1
Liberal Democrats	Clifford Hobbs	251	8.8	+0.5
Green	Richard Kimberlee	186	6.5	N/A
Majority		42	1.4	–5.1
Turnout		2,846		
Conservative hold				

Malvern Chase
Party	Candidate	Votes	%	±%
Green	Malcolm Victory*	1,518	48.8	N/A
Conservative	Sebastian Barbour	628	20.2	–11.4
Reform	Angel Chawner	507	16.3	N/A
Liberal Democrats	Emma Trueman	360	11.6	–25.8
Labour	Anna Cummins	98	3.2	–5.1
Majority		890	28.6	N/A
Turnout		3,111		
Green gain from Liberal Democrats				

Malvern Langland
Party	Candidate	Votes	%	±%
Liberal Democrats	Paul Bennett	716	26.7	+1.5
Conservative	Julie Maclusky	685	25.6	–3.0
Reform	Jeanette Sheen	510	19.0	N/A
Labour	Beverley Nielsen*	456	17.0	+2.1
Green	Simon Johnson	312	11.6	N/A
Majority		31	1.1	N/A
Turnout		2,679		
Liberal Democrats gain from Independent		Swing	▲2.3	

Malvern Link
Party	Candidate	Votes	%	±%
Liberal Democrats	Chris McSweeny	824	28.0	+6.5
Reform	Andy Peplow	703	23.9	+21.4
Conservative	Karen Hanks*	685	23.3	–9.7
Green	Fran Victory	547	18.6	N/A
Labour	Christopher Burrows	184	6.3	–7.2
Majority		121	4.1	N/A
Turnout		2,943		
Liberal Democrats gain from Conservative		Swing	▼7.5	

Malvern Trinity
Party	Candidate	Votes	%	±%
Green	Natalie McVey*	1,559	52.5	–3.6
Reform	Michael Savage	509	17.1	+13.6
Conservative	David Watkins	462	15.5	–12.7
Liberal Democrats	Jamie Cramp	251	8.4	+3.2
Labour	Brian Burdon	109	3.7	–3.3
Independent	Graeme Stubbs	82	2.8	N/A
Majority		1,050	35.4	+7.5
Turnout		2,972		
Green hold		Swing	▼8.6	

Powick & Longdon
Party	Candidate	Votes	%
Independent	Tom Wells*	2,194	65.1
Reform	Max Windsor-Peplow	622	18.5
Conservative	Glen Promnitz	361	10.7
Liberal Democrats	Paul Boatright-Greene	117	3.5
Labour	Christopher Taylor	75	2.2
Majority		1,572	46.6
Turnout		3,369	
Independent win (new seat)			

Tenbury
Party	Candidate	Votes	%	±%
Reform	Justin Bowen	1,198	39.0	N/A
Conservative	Carl Fordington	1,072	34.9	–34.7
Liberal Democrats	Jed Marson	341	11.1	+5.8
Green	Peter Jones	314	10.2	–4.2
Labour	Adam Scott	150	4.9	–5.8
Majority		126	4.1	N/A
Turnout		3,075		
Reform gain from Conservative				

=== Redditch ===
Redditch district summary
Party	Seats	+/-	Votes	%	+/-
Reform UK	8	▲8	14,971	39.2	N/A
Conservative	0	▼8	9,862	25.8	–27.7
Labour	0	Steady	8,328	21.8	–8.6
Green	0	Steady	2,939	7.7	+0.8
Liberal Democrats	0	Steady	2,067	5.4	–0.8
Total	8	Steady	38,167		

Division results

Redditch Central (2 seats)
Party	Candidate	Votes	%
Reform	Dave Edmonds	1,597	39.9
Reform	Richard Tudge	1,524	38.0
Labour	Andrew Fry	1,095	27.3
Labour	Jane Spilsbury	951	23.7
Conservative	Michael Chalk	949	23.7
Conservative	Christopher Holz	781	19.5
Green	Clare Beckhelling	434	10.8
Green	Adam Price	322	8.0
Liberal Democrats	Andy Holmes	181	4.5
Liberal Democrats	Karen Holmes	180	4.5
Turnout		~4,007	
Reform win (new seat)			
Reform win (new seat)			

Redditch East (2 seats)
Party	Candidate	Votes	%
Reform	Joanne Monk*	2,120	45.7
Reform	David Taylor	1,994	43.0
Conservative	Karen Ashley	1,130	24.4
Conservative	Juliet Brunner	1,121	24.2
Labour	Jen Snape	968	20.9
Labour	Bill Hartnett	961	20.7
Green	Kathryn Manning	306	6.6
Green	Kevin White	252	5.4
Liberal Democrats	Elaine Drage	227	4.9
Liberal Democrats	Charles Tucker	195	4.2
Turnout		~4,637	
Reform win (new seat)			
Reform win (new seat)			

Redditch South (2 seats)
Party	Candidate	Votes	%	±%
Reform	Roger Bennett	2,261	40.3	N/A
Reform	Sue Eacock	2,120	37.8	N/A
Conservative	Brandon Clayton*	1,579	28.1	–29.1
Conservative	Craig Warhurst*	1,564	27.9	–26.1
Labour	Juliet Barker Smith	1,152	20.5	–3.0
Labour	William Boyd	978	17.4	–4.0
Green	Claire Davies	482	8.6	–1.2
Liberal Democrats	Ann Gee	403	7.2	+1.5
Green	Ben Bradley	389	6.9	+0.8
Liberal Democrats	David Gee	299	5.3	+0.1
Turnout		~5,614		
Reform gain from Conservative				
Reform gain from Conservative				

Redditch West (2 seats)
Party	Candidate	Votes	%
Reform	Ashley Monk	1,695	35.1
Reform	Stephen Foster	1,660	34.4
Conservative	Matt Dormer*	1,451	30.1
Conservative	Emma Marshall*	1,287	26.7
Labour	Robin Lunn	1,113	23.1
Labour	Monica Stringfellow	1,110	23.0
Green	David Thain	442	9.2
Liberal Democrats	John Marsh	326	6.8
Green	Glen Theobald	312	6.5
Liberal Democrats	Andy Thompson	256	5.3
Turnout		~4,826	
Reform win (new seat)			
Reform win (new seat)			

=== Worcester ===
Worcester district summary
Party	Seats	+/-	Votes	%	+/-
Green	4	▲3	8,137	30.4	+8.9
Reform UK	3	▲3	6,986	26.1	+25.7
Labour	2	Steady	4,422	16.5	–9.4
Liberal Democrats	1	Steady	3,139	11.7	+2.2
Conservative	0	▼6	4,064	15.2	–26.7
TUSC	0	Steady	42	0.2	–0.2
UKIP	0	Steady	19	0.1	N/A
Total	10	Steady	26,809		

Division results

Bedwardine
Party	Candidate	Votes	%	±%
Reform	Alan Amos*	1,182	41.5	N/A
Labour	Matt Lamb	678	23.8	–3.5
Conservative	Chris Rimell	408	14.3	–38.1
Green	Martin Jones	293	10.3	–0.5
Liberal Democrats	Stephen Dorrell	289	10.1	+3.1
Majority		504	17.7	N/A
Turnout		2,850		
Reform gain from Conservative				

Claines
Party	Candidate	Votes	%	±%
Liberal Democrats	Mel Allcott*	1,656	54.0	+8.0
Reform	Martin Williams	564	18.4	+17.2
Green	Mandy Neill	400	13.0	+4.3
Conservative	Trish Nosal	289	9.4	–24.7
Labour	Jenny Benfield	159	5.2	–4.8
Majority		1,092	35.6	
Turnout		3,068		
Liberal Democrats hold		Swing	▼4.6	

Nunnery
Party	Candidate	Votes	%	±%
Reform	Dave Aubrey	718	30.5	N/A
Labour	Bash Ali	664	28.2	–11.6
Conservative	Allah Ditta*	548	23.3	–22.5
Green	Barbara Mitra	289	12.3	+2.2
Liberal Democrats	Scott Butler	134	5.7	+1.5
Majority		54	2.3	N/A
Turnout		2,353		
Reform gain from Conservative				

Rainbow Hill & Fort Royal
Party	Candidate	Votes	%
Labour	Jabba Riaz	794	32.6
Green	Clare Wratten	768	31.5
Reform	David Carney	595	24.4
Conservative	Gergory Wilkins	185	7.6
Liberal Democrats	Bart Ricketts	70	2.9
TUSC	Mark Davies	24	1.0
Majority		26	1.1
Turnout		2,436	
Labour win (new seat)			

Riverside
Party	Candidate	Votes	%	±%
Green	Tor Pingree	1,280	44.1	+29.1
Conservative	Simon Geraghty*	726	25.0	–24.6
Reform	John Beacham	508	17.5	+15.4
Labour	Robyn Norfolk	267	9.2	–18.8
Liberal Democrats	Paul Jagger	102	3.5	–0.8
TUSC	Archie Harrison	18	0.6	–0.4
Majority		554	19.1	N/A
Turnout		2,901		
Green gain from Conservative		Swing	▲26.9	

St John
Party	Candidate	Votes	%	±%
Labour	Richard Udall*	892	41.8	–16.4
Reform	Martin Hewlett	570	26.7	N/A
Green	Sarah Edwards	308	14.4	+4.6
Conservative	Bertie Ballinger	277	13.0	–13.7
Liberal Democrats	Peter Jackson	66	3.1	–0.7
UKIP	Martin Potter	19	0.9	N/A
Majority		322	15.1	–16.4
Turnout		2,132		
Labour hold				

St Peter
Party	Candidate	Votes	%	±%
Green	Louis Stephen	1,639	51.6	+6.8
Reform	Paul Hickling	758	23.9	N/A
Conservative	Tom Wisniewski	481	15.1	–30.5
Labour	Ian Benfield	176	5.5	–1.6
Liberal Democrats	Stuart Wild	122	3.8	+1.3
Majority		881	27.7	N/A
Turnout		3,176		
Green gain from Conservative				

St Stephen
Party	Candidate	Votes	%	±%
Green	Matt Jenkins*	1,678	61.0	+4.3
Reform	Roger Brooker	541	19.7	N/A
Conservative	Angelika Wisniewska	233	8.5	–11.4
Labour	Ruth Coates	203	7.4	–13.2
Liberal Democrats	Jon Taylor	96	3.5	+0.8
Majority		1,137	41.3	+5.4
Turnout		2,751		
Green hold				

Warndon & Elbury Park
Party	Candidate	Votes	%
Reform	Owen Cleary	866	49.6
Labour	Jill Desayrah	440	25.2
Conservative	James Stanley	233	13.3
Green	Alex Mace	140	8.0
Liberal Democrats	Sarah Neale	68	3.9
Majority		426	24.4
Turnout		1,747	
Reform win (new seat)			

Warndon Villages
Party	Candidate	Votes	%
Green	Andrew Cross*	1,342	43.5
Reform	Connor Smith	684	22.2
Liberal Democrats	Sarah Murray	536	17.4
Conservative	Lucy Hodgson	377	12.2
Labour	Ed Kimberley	149	4.8
Majority		658	21.3
Turnout		3,088	
Green win (new seat)			

=== Wychavon ===
Wychavon district summary
Party	Seats	+/-	Votes	%	+/-
Conservative	7	▼4	12,258	33.1	–28.4
Reform UK	3	▲3	11,311	30.5	+29.5
Liberal Democrats	1	Steady	6,876	18.5	+4.2
Green	1	▲1	4,008	10.8	+1.9
Labour	0	Steady	2,187	5.9	–6.2
Independent	0	Steady	427	1.2	–0.1
Heritage	0	Steady	16	<0.1	N/A
Total	12	Steady	37,083		

Division results

Bowbrook
Party	Candidate	Votes	%	±%
Conservative	Seb James	1,061	35.1	–23.6
Reform	Peter Jewell	969	32.1	+27.9
Liberal Democrats	Margaret Rowley	599	19.8	–4.1
Green	Stephen Squires	195	6.5	N/A
Labour	Mike Stafford	195	6.5	–6.8
Majority		92	3.0	–31.8
Turnout		3,019		
Conservative hold		Swing	▼25.9	

Bredon
Party	Candidate	Votes	%	±%
Conservative	Adrian Hardman*	1,239	32.8	–35.4
Liberal Democrats	Sharon Gibbons	1,226	32.5	+19.5
Reform	Joe Davin	981	26.0	N/A
Green	Margaret Forrest	260	6.9	–4.9
Labour	Hannah McGahan	69	1.8	–5.2
Majority		13	0.3	–54.9
Turnout		3,775		
Conservative hold		Swing	▼27.5	

Broadway
Party	Candidate	Votes	%	±%
Conservative	Emma Kearsey	1,137	33.4	–39.4
Reform	Keith Williams	1,098	32.3	N/A
Liberal Democrats	Angie Crump	928	27.3	+12.5
Green	Madeline Kirby	138	4.1	N/A
Labour	David Owen	101	3.0	–6.3
Majority		39	1.1	–56.9
Turnout		3,402		
Conservative hold				

Droitwich East
Party	Candidate	Votes	%	±%
Conservative	Daniel Birch	1,324	43.1	–22.3
Reform	Christopher Edmondson	729	23.7	N/A
Green	Nicola Morris	691	22.5	+10.9
Labour	Louis Allaway	176	5.7	–6.4
Liberal Democrats	Owen Ralph	154	5.0	–5.9
Majority		595	19.4	–33.9
Turnout		3,074		
Conservative hold				

Droitwich West
Party	Candidate	Votes	%	±%
Conservative	Richard Morris*	1,276	49.2	–13.3
Reform	Dom Mitchell	765	29.5	N/A
Labour	Gill Rawlings	260	10.0	–18.0
Liberal Democrats	Roy Harmsworth	155	6.0	–3.5
Green	Doug Hincks	137	5.3	N/A
Majority		511	19.7	
Turnout		2,593		
Conservative hold				

Evesham North West
Party	Candidate	Votes	%	±%
Reform	Sam Bastow	934	39.0	N/A
Conservative	Mark Goodge	707	29.5	–31.0
Labour	Mary Tasker	305	12.7	–11.5
Green	Nancie Buckland	253	10.6	N/A
Liberal Democrats	Matthew Jones	196	8.2	–0.7
Majority		227	9.5	N/A
Turnout		2,395		
Reform gain from Conservative				

Evesham South
Party	Candidate	Votes	%	±%
Reform	Michele Hulme	924	33.9	+26.0
Green	Marino Cretu	609	22.3	–11.1
Conservative	Emma Stokes*	493	18.1	–26.1
Independent	Rob Robinson	427	15.7	N/A
Labour	Amanda Capewell	174	6.4	N/A
Liberal Democrats	Sally Jones	99	3.6	N/A
Majority		315	11.6	N/A
Turnout		2,726		
Reform gain from Conservative		Swing	▲18.6	

Harvington
Party	Candidate	Votes	%	±%
Reform	Satinder Bell	1,162	35.1	N/A
Conservative	Terry Bennett	1,109	33.5	–31.5
Labour	David Tasker	435	13.2	–3.1
Green	Paul Clayson	330	10.0	–8.7
Liberal Democrats	Andrew Fieldsend-Roxborough	270	8.2	N/A
Majority		53	1.6	N/A
Turnout		3,306		
Reform gain from Conservative				

Littletons
Party	Candidate	Votes	%	±%
Green	Hannah Robson	890	31.6	+21.0
Reform	Liz Williams	889	31.6	N/A
Conservative	Aaron Powell	833	29.6	–39.6
Labour	Neal Cartwright	96	3.4	–12.3
Liberal Democrats	John Littlechild	89	3.2	–1.3
Heritage	Graham Kemp	16	0.6	N/A
Majority		0	0.0	N/A
Turnout		2,812		
Green gain from Conservative				

The result in Littletons was a tie between Hannah Robson and Liz Williams. Electoral law in the United Kingdom requires the Returning Officer to decide between candidates by lot in the event of a tie. In this case, one of the two candidates' names was drawn at random from a box, and Robson was returned. The official declaration shows the winning candidate having one extra vote in the event of a tie. On 25 June, Williams lodged an election petition with the High Court alleging undue interference and fraud. In October, the case was thrown out on a technicality because Williams had missed the deadline to submit her claim to the High Court.

Ombersley
Party	Candidate	Votes	%	±%
Conservative	Tony Miller*	1,259	40.8	–31.2
Reform	Gary Thompson	1,215	39.4	N/A
Liberal Democrats	Michael Sturt-Joy	222	7.2	+0.3
Green	David Chamberlain	215	7.0	–3.1
Labour	Sachin Mathur	175	5.7	–5.3
Majority		44	1.4	–59.6
Turnout		3,086		
Conservative hold				

Pershore
Party	Candidate	Votes	%	±%
Liberal Democrats	Dan Boatright-Greene*	2,263	60.7	+4.5
Reform	Paul Wallis	817	21.9	N/A
Conservative	Sam Tarran	502	13.5	–21.4
Green	Fiona Nunan	82	2.2	N/A
Labour	Christopher Windsor	67	1.8	–2.7
Majority		1,446	38.8	+17.5
Turnout		3,731		
Liberal Democrats hold				

Upton Snodsbury
Party	Candidate	Votes	%	±%
Conservative	Linda Robinson*	1,318	41.7	–26.5
Reform	Sean Stock	828	26.2	N/A
Liberal Democrats	Philip Killoran	675	21.3	+10.6
Green	Robert Nichols	208	6.6	–3.8
Labour Co-op	Steve Ainsworth	134	4.2	–6.5
Majority		490	15.5	–42.0
Turnout		3,163		
Conservative hold				

=== Wyre Forest ===
Wyre Forest district summary
Party	Seats	+/-	Votes	%	+/-
Reform UK	8	▲8	10,057	38.4	N/A
Conservative	2	▼8	7,032	26.8	–22.0
Labour	0	Steady	3,152	12.0	–6.4
Independent	0	Steady	1,846	7.0	+0.2
Liberal Democrats	0	Steady	1,705	6.5	–1.2
Green	0	Steady	1,672	6.4	–0.4
Liberal	0	Steady	755	2.9	N/A
Total	10	Steady	26,219		

Division results

Bewdley
Party	Candidate	Votes	%	±%
Conservative	Dan Morehead*	1,244	40.5	–8.9
Reform	Lisa Hyde	1,070	34.8	N/A
Labour	Rod Stanczyszyn	393	12.8	–6.7
Green	Corinne Bailey	237	7.7	–4.8
Liberal Democrats	Ingrid Schmeising-Barnes	131	4.3	+1.7
Majority		174	5.7	–24.2
Turnout		3,075		
Conservative hold				

Chaddesley
Party	Candidate	Votes	%	±%
Conservative	Marcus Hart*	1,024	34.7	–19.8
Reform	Philip Hingley	948	32.1	N/A
Independent	Helen Dyke	664	22.5	–11.0
Labour	Stuart Holmes	159	5.4	–3.2
Green	Wren Nicholson	108	3.7	N/A
Liberal Democrats	Linda Hardwick	46	1.6	N/A
Majority		76	2.6	–18.4
Turnout		2,949		
Conservative hold				

Cookley, Wolerley & Wribbenhall
Party	Candidate	Votes	%	±%
Reform	Jenny Shaw	1,122	38.4	N/A
Conservative	Ben Brookes	975	33.4	–22.2
Labour	Philip Edmundson	454	15.5	–4.0
Green	Kate Spohrer	253	8.7	–0.2
Liberal Democrats	Cloud Gollop	118	4.0	+2.7
Majority		147	5.0	N/A
Turnout		2,922		
Reform gain from Conservative				

St Barnabas
Party	Candidate	Votes	%	±%
Reform	Anthony Upton	1,022	41.9	N/A
Conservative	David Ross*	757	31.0	–14.9
Labour Co-op	Bernadette Connor	353	14.5	–9.7
Liberal Democrats	Oliver Walker	167	6.8	+3.7
Green	Dave Finch	140	5.7	–0.8
Majority		265	10.9	N/A
Turnout		2,439		
Reform gain from Conservative				

St Chads
Party	Candidate	Votes	%	±%
Reform	Bill Hopkins*	812	36.6	N/A
Liberal	Fran Oborski	591	26.6	N/A
Labour Co-op	Marie Holmes	232	10.5	–3.6
Liberal Democrats	Nigel Grace	226	10.2	–26.7
Conservative	Steven Hollands	214	9.6	–30.7
Green	Brett Caulfield	143	6.4	–2.3
Majority		221	10.0	N/A
Turnout		2,218		
Reform gain from Conservative				

St Georges
Party	Candidate	Votes	%
Reform	Mark Crosby	872	40.8
Independent	Tony Muir*	331	15.5
Labour Co-op	Di Smith	309	14.4
Conservative	Kevin Gale	229	10.7
Liberal	Shazu Miah	164	7.7
Green	Oskar Hyams	152	7.1
Liberal Democrats	Mark Heafield	82	3.8
Majority		541	25.3
Turnout		2,139	
Reform win (new seat)			

St Johns
Party	Candidate	Votes	%	±%
Reform	Matthew Jones	946	36.5	N/A
Conservative	John Campion	622	24.0	–32.7
Independent	Leigh Whitehouse	350	13.5	N/A
Labour Co-op	John Beckingham	336	13.0	–10.8
Green	John Davis	247	9.5	+2.8
Liberal Democrats	Suzanne Nicholl	93	3.6	–1.0
Majority		324	12.5	N/A
Turnout		2,594		
Reform gain from Conservative				

St Peters
Party	Candidate	Votes	%
Reform	Rob Wharton	813	35.4
Conservative	Nathan Desmond*	624	27.2
Labour	Keith Budden	336	14.6
Independent	Peter Dyke	234	10.2
Liberal Democrats	Clare Cassidy	167	7.3
Green	Doug Hine	123	5.4
Majority		189	8.2
Turnout		2,297	
Reform win (new seat)			

Stourport - Areley Kings & Riverside
Party	Candidate	Votes	%
Reform	Karl Perks	1,154	45.6
Conservative	Alan Sutton	596	23.6
Independent	John Thomas	267	10.6
Labour	William Moule	248	9.8
Liberal Democrats	Timothy Schmeising-Barnes	139	5.5
Green	Clive Wood	124	4.9
Majority		558	22.0
Turnout		2,528	
Reform win (new seat)			

Stourport - Mitton
Party	Candidate	Votes	%
Reform	Ian Cresswell	1,298	42.4
Conservative	Chris Rodgers*	747	24.4
Liberal Democrats	John Caldwell	536	17.5
Labour	Jackie Griffiths	332	10.9
Green	Gilda Davis	145	4.7
Majority		551	18.0
Turnout		3,058	
Reform win (new seat)			

== Changes 2025–2027 ==
- In February 2026, David Taylor left the Reform UK group to sit as an independent.
- In May 2026, Jo Monk and Ashley Monk were suspended by Reform UK and became independent councillors. They formed the Worcestershire Independent Group with Taylor.
- On 14 May 2026, Jo Monk resigned as leader of the council and was succeeded by Matt Jenkins, leader of the Green and Independent Alliance. Jenkins was supported by the Conservative, Liberal Democrat and Worcestershire Independent groups.
- In May 2026, Matthew Jones left Reform UK and joined the Worcestershire Independent Group.
- In July 2026, Karl Perks defected from Reform UK to the Conservatives.
- In August 2026, Martin Allen defected from the Green Party to the Liberal Democrats.

=== By-elections ===
==== Bromsgrove South ====
The Bromsgrove South by-election was triggered by the resignation of Reform UK councillor Gaynor Jean-Louis.

Bromsgrove South by-election, 30 October 2025
Party	Candidate	Votes	%	±%
Liberal Democrats	Sam Ammar	1,416	51.9	+20.3
Reform	Philip Hingley	911	33.4	−1.5
Conservative	Matt Dormer	309	11.3	−5.8
Labour	Laura Rollins	92	3.4	−4.1
Majority		505	18.5	
Turnout		2728	30.3	−0.3
Registered electors		9,027		
Liberal Democrats gain from Reform		Swing	10.9	

== See also ==
- Worcestershire County Council elections
