= 2017 Worcestershire County Council election =

2017 UK local government election

← 2013	4 May 2017	2021 →

All 57 council division seats 29 seats needed for a majority
	First party	Second party
Party	Conservative	Labour
Last election	30	12
Seats won	40	10
Seat change	▲10	▼2
Popular vote	82,400	40,235
Percentage	46.85%	22.88%
Swing	▲13.55%	▼1.06%
	Third party	Fourth party	Fifth party
Party	UKIP	Liberal Democrats	Green
Last election	4	3	2
Seats won	0	3	2
Seat change	▼4	Steady	Steady
Popular vote	9,778	20,475	11,862
Percentage	5.56%	11.64%	6.74%
Swing	▼14.88%	▲3.98%	▲1.71%
- Map showing the results of the 2017 Worcestershire County Council election. Striped divisions have mixed representation.
Council control before election
Conservative
Council control after election
TBD

The 2017 Worcestershire County Council election took place on 4 May 2017 as part of the 2017 local elections in the United Kingdom. All 57 councillors were elected from 53 electoral divisions which returned either one or two county councillors each by first-past-the-post voting for a four-year term of office. The Conservatives extended their majority in the council, gaining ten seats, largely at the expense of Labour and UKIP, who lost six seats between them; the Conservative majority increased from one seat to eleven. The number of seats for the Liberal Democrats and Green remained the same, with the Conservatives gaining the remaining five seats from independent politicians and candidates from smaller parties. The Conservatives lost one seat, Alvechurch, to an independent. The Liberals lost their only seat, St Chads in the Wyre Forest district, after they decided not to field any candidates; the Liberal Democrats held the seat, however. UKIP lost all their seats in this election to the Conservatives.

== Results summary ==
Worcestershire County Council Election Overall Result 2017
Party	Seats	Gains	Losses	Net gain/loss	Seats %	Votes %	Votes	+/−
Conservative	40	11	1	+10	70.18	46.85	82,400	+13.55
Labour	10	0	2	-2	17.54	22.88	40,235	-1.06
Liberal Democrats	3	1	-1	0	5.26	11.64	20,475	+3.98
Green	2	0	0	0	3.51	6.74	11,862	+1.71
Other parties	2	1	4	-3	3.51	6.3	11,140	
UKIP	0	0	4	-4	0.00	5.56	9,778	-14.88

=== Bromsgrove ===
Alvechurch
Party	Candidate	Votes	%	±%
Independent	Charlie Hotham	1,174	41.94	N/A
Conservative	June Griffiths	1,101	39.34	▲9.80
Liberal Democrats	Sandra Docker	287	10.25	N/A
UKIP	James Goad	125	4.47	▼22.39
Green	Peter Harvey	112	4.00	▼1.27
Turnout		2,799	37.95	
Independent gain from Conservative		Swing	▲25.87	

Beacon
Party	Candidate	Votes	%	±%
Labour	Peter McDonald	1,541	45.46	▼2.12
Conservative	Richard Deeming	1,418	41.83	▲5.99
Green	Jill Harvey	226	6.67	▼3.93
Liberal Democrats	Diana Ball	205	6.05	N/A
Turnout		3,390	36.97	
Labour hold		Swing	▼4.06	

Bromsgrove Central
Party	Candidate	Votes	%	±%
Conservative	Rita Dent	1,166	41.70	▲6.70
Liberal Democrats	Robert Hunter	798	28.54	▲22.63
Labour	Jacqui O'Reilly	527	18.85	▼9.15
UKIP	Adrian Smart	186	6.65	▼19.50
Green	Michelle Baker	119	4.26	▲0.53
Turnout		2,796	38.33	
Conservative hold		Swing	▲7.93	

Bromsgrove East
Party	Candidate	Votes	%	±%
Conservative	Kit Taylor	1,697	59.36	▲20.26
Liberal Democrats	Janet King	514	17.98	▲1.55
Labour	Rory Shannon	426	14.90	▼2.59
Green	Stan Baker	222	7.76	N/A
Turnout		2,859	36.18	
Conservative hold		Swing	▲11.43	

Bromsgrove South
Party	Candidate	Votes	%	±%
Labour	Christopher Bloore	1,263	50.50	▲1.99
Conservative	Claire Jones	1,013	40.50	▲7.82
Liberal Democrats	Leah-Nani Alconcel	123	4.92	▲0.77
Green	Marcus Draper	102	4.08	▼3.32
Turnout		2,501	31.52	
Labour hold		Swing	▼3.91	

Bromsgrove West
Party	Candidate	Votes	%	±%
Labour	Luke Mallett	1,640	64.95	▲12.69
Conservative	Melanie Britton	709	28.08	▲6.52
Liberal Democrats	Michael Mihailovic	90	3.56	▲1.08
Green	David Baker	86	3.41	N/A
Turnout		2,525	33.36	
Labour hold		Swing	▲9.61	

Clent Hills
Party	Candidate	Votes	%	±%
Conservative	Karen May	1,574	45.33	▲15.88
Independent	Steve Colella	1,426	41.07	N/A
Labour	Lorraine Johnson	236	6.80	▲0.32
Green	Susan Jones	131	3.77	N/A
Liberal Democrats	Leia Beavis	105	3.02	N/A
Turnout		3,472	39.54	
Conservative gain from Independent		Swing	▲31.33	

Woodvale
Party	Candidate	Votes	%	±%
Conservative	Shirley Webb	1,764	62.53	▲11.1
Labour	Bernard McEldowney	721	25.56	▼8.83
Liberal Democrats	Christopher Walker	173	6.13	N/A
Green	Julian Gray	163	5.78	▼8.4
Turnout		2,821	33.42	
Conservative hold		Swing	▲9.72	

Wythall
Party	Candidate	Votes	%	±%
Conservative	Adam Kent	1,231	49.80	▲17.36
Independent	Stephen Peters	970	39.24	▼11.82
Liberal Democrats	Kenneth Richardson	170	6.88	▲4.99
Green	Angela Day	101	4.09	N/A
Turnout		2,472	34.36	
Conservative gain from Independent		Swing	▲14.59	

=== Malvern Hills ===
Croome
Party	Candidate	Votes	%	±%
Conservative	Paul Middlebrough	1,091	43.16	▲13.16
Independent	Roger Sutton	970	38.37	▲5.11
Labour	Irene Stickley	163	6.45	▼3.52
UKIP	Doug Guest	158	6.25	▼20.53
Green	John Lambeth	146	5.78	N/A
Turnout		2,528	36.67	
Conservative gain from Independent		Swing	▲9.14	

Hallow
Party	Candidate	Votes	%	±%
Conservative	Phil Grove	1,991	71.34	▲33.39
Labour	Colin Bexley	337	12.07	▲4.13
Liberal Democrats	John Drage	320	11.47	N/A
UKIP	Danny Young	143	5.12	▼24.75
Turnout		2,899	40.53	
Conservative hold		Swing	▲29.07	

Malvern Chase
Party	Candidate	Votes	%	±%
Conservative	Lucy Hodgson	1,372	47.33	▲17.63
Liberal Democrats	William Chaundy	699	24.11	▼4.59
Labour	John Gallagher	417	14.38	▲3.78
Green	Jackie Smethurst	260	8.97	▲0.67
UKIP	Jeanette Sheen	151	5.21	▼17.39
Turnout		2,899	41%	
Conservative hold		Swing	▲11.11	

Malvern Langland
Party	Candidate	Votes	%	±%
Conservative	James O'Donnell	767	33.86	▲9.14
Liberal Democrats	Caroline Bovey	723	31.92	▲8.54
Labour	Lynne Lambeth	384	16.95	▲3.28
Independent	Ian Hopwood	155	6.84	N/A
Green	Dinah Sage	137	6.05	▼2.77
UKIP	Richard Spencer	99	4.37	▼20.2
Turnout		2,265	30.3	
Conservative hold		Swing	▲14.67	

Malvern Link
Party	Candidate	Votes	%	±%
Conservative	Paul Tuthill	1,327	45.89	▲11.45
Liberal Democrats	Kwai Hung Chan	794	27.46	▲20.96
Labour	Martin Willis	408	14.11	▲0.22
Green	William Jenkins	208	7.19	▼10.45
UKIP	Mike Savage	155	5.36	▼22.17
Turnout		2,892	37.65	
Conservative hold		Swing	▲16.81	

Malvern Trinity
Party	Candidate	Votes	%	±%
Green	John Raine	930	38.18	▲13.31
Conservative	Tony Baker	765	31.03	▲8.95
Liberal Democrats	Kaleem Askar	365	14.98	▼4.55
Labour	Samantha Charles	262	10.76	▲1.88
UKIP	Len Marshall	123	5.05	▼19.59
Turnout		2,436	37.36	
Green hold		Swing	▲16.45	

Powick
Party	Candidate	Votes	%	±%
Liberal Democrats	Tom Wells	2,407	72.2	▲5.10
Conservative	Justin Chieffo	807	24.21	▲9.11
UKIP	David Barrie	120	3.60	▼8.95
Turnout		3,334	43.94	
Liberal Democrats hold		Swing	▼7.11	

Tenbury
Party	Candidate	Votes	%	±%
Conservative	Ken Pollock	1,772	60.07	▲4.68
Labour	Jonathan Pryce Morgan	551	18.68	▲8.31
Liberal Democrats	Elaine Drage	255	8.64	N/A
Green	Stephen Main	192	6.51	▼2.20
UKIP	Malcolm Delingpole	180	6.10	▼19.43
Turnout		2,950	36.80	
Conservative hold		Swing	▲12.06	

=== Redditch ===
Arrow Valley East
Party	Candidate	Votes	%	±%
Conservative	Juliet Brunner	2,000	37.88	
Conservative	Tom Baker-Price	1,957	37.06	
Labour	Joe Baker	1,913	36.23	
Labour	Wanda King	1,637	31.00	
UKIP	Paul Swansborough	965	18.28	
UKIP	Peter Bridle	849	16.08	
Liberal Democrats	David Gee	316	5.98	
Liberal Democrats	Hans Windheuser	209	3.96	
Green	Robert Wardell	167	3.16	
Green	Rylma White	155	2.94	
Turnout		10,168	32.47	
Conservative gain from UKIP		Swing	▲8.91	
Conservative gain from Labour		Swing	▲5.71	

Arrow Valley West
Party	Candidate	Votes	%	±%
Labour	Andrew Fry	1,943	44.00	
Labour	Pattie Hill	1,797	40.69	
Conservative	Matthew Dormer	1,574	35.64	
Conservative	David Thain	1,276	28.89	
UKIP	Scott Preston	468	10.60	
UKIP	Kathy Haslam	466	10.55	
Liberal Democrats	Diane Thomas	290	6.57	
Liberal Democrats	Russell Taylor	220	4.98	
Green	Rachel Wardell	176	3.99	
Green	Kevin White	126	2.85	
Independent	Sharnah Wynn	121	2.74	N/A
Turnout		8,457	30.74	
Labour hold		Swing	▼2.95	
Labour hold		Swing	▼1.80	

Redditch North
Party	Candidate	Votes	%	±%
Labour	Robin Lunn	1,994	42.07	
Conservative	Brandon Clayton	1,921	40.53	
Labour	Graham Vickery	1,841	38.84	
Conservative	Gareth Prosser	1,698	35.82	
UKIP	Sally Woodhall	388	8.19	
UKIP	Barry Thornton	377	7.95	
Green	Steven Pound	264	5.57	
Liberal Democrats	Anthony Pitt	257	5.42	
Green	Simon Venables	238	5.02	
Liberal Democrats	Ian Webster	189	3.99	
Turnout		9,167	32.87	
Labour hold		Swing	▲4.81	
Conservative gain from Labour		Swing	▲3.99	

Redditch South
Party	Candidate	Votes	%	±%
Conservative	Roger Bennett	2,998	55.88	
Conservative	Jane Potter	2,519	46.95	
Labour	Dr. Gillian Cooper	1,467	27.34	
Labour	Mike Lewington	1,313	24.47	
UKIP	Melvyn Haugh	463	8.63	
Liberal Democrats	Pamela Gee	357	6.65	
Liberal Democrats	Rita Hindle	341	6.36	
UKIP	David Greenwood	338	6.30	
Green	Claire Davies	312	5.82	
Green	Alistair Waugh	237	4.42	
Turnout		10,345	34.58	
Conservative hold		Swing	▲12.19	
Conservative gain from UKIP		Swing	▲9.55	

=== Worcester ===
Bedwardine
Party	Candidate	Votes	%	±%
Conservative	Alan Amos	1,460	53.05	▲14.05
Labour	Daniel Walton	808	29.36	▲6.48
Liberal Democrats	Mike Mullins	218	7.92	▲2.72
Green	Daniel Daye	140	5.09	▼0.16
UKIP	Paul Hickling	126	4.58	▼20.56
Turnout		2,752	38.66	
Conservative hold		Swing	▲17.31	

Claines
Party	Candidate	Votes	%	±%
Conservative	Andy Stafford	1,543	45.64	▲15.95
Liberal Democrats	Mel Allcott	1,096	32.42	▼1.21
Labour	Robert Lodge	446	13.19	▲1.49
Green	Peter Robinson	197	5.83	▼1.02
UKIP	Mark Hulme	99	2.93	▼15.20
Turnout		3,381	44.97	
Conservative gain from Liberal Democrats		Swing	▲8.58	

Gorse Hill and Warndon
Party	Candidate	Votes	%	±%
Labour	Ceri Stalker	923	47.82	▼4.37
Conservative	Phoenix Jones	587	30.41	▲18.73
UKIP	Owen Cleary	276	14.30	▼16.85
Green	Paul Snookes	105	5.44	▲0.46
Britain First	Linda Bell	39	2.02	N/A
Turnout		1,930	25.17	
Labour hold		Swing	▲10.61	

Nunnery
Party	Candidate	Votes	%	±%
Labour Co-op	Pat Agar	1,049	49.43	▼1.70
Conservative	Chris Mitchell	708	33.36	▲2.75
UKIP	Jon Barras	148	6.97	N/A
Green	Barbara Mitra	125	5.89	▼2.66
Liberal Democrats	Karen Lawrence	125	3.82	N/A
Britain First	Carl Mason	11	0.52	N/A
Turnout		2,122	32.50	
Labour Co-op hold		Swing	▼2.26	

Rainbow Hill
Party	Candidate	Votes	%	±%
Labour Co-op	Paul Denham	1,027	49.42	▲4.0
Conservative	Francis Lankester	615	29.60	▲1.82
Green	Marjory Bisset	150	7.22	▲0.82
UKIP	David Carney	112	5.39	▼13.94
Liberal Democrats	Taylor Jon	71	3.42	N/A
Women's Equality	Leisa Taylor	66	3.18	N/A
Independent	Alex Rugg	37	1.78	N/A
Turnout		2,078	31.16	
Labour Co-op hold		Swing	▲2.91	

Riverside
Party	Candidate	Votes	%	±%
Conservative	Simon Geraghty	1,561	49.94	▲10.99
Labour	Lynn Denham	994	31.80	▼2.04
Green	Hannah Cooper	238	7.61	▲0.79
Liberal Democrats	Ken Carpenter	211	6.75	N/A
UKIP	Hazel Finch	122	3.90	▼14.35
Turnout		3,126	39.26	
Conservative hold		Swing	▲6.52	

St. John
Party	Candidate	Votes	%	±%
Labour Co-op	Richard Udall	1,003	57.38	▼2.35
Conservative	Irene Deamer	481	27.52	▲6.23
UKIP	Rob Menzies	102	5.84	N/A
Green	Richard Morris	91	5.21	▼1.85
Liberal Democrats	Steve Mather	71	4.06	N/A
Turnout		1,748	30.12	
Labour Co-op hold		Swing	▼4.29	

St. Peter
Party	Candidate	Votes	%	±%
Conservative	Steve MacKay	2,014	52.57	▲1.62
Green	Jane Moorhouse	1,363	35.58	▲23.11
Labour	Stephen Tallett	347	9.06	▼20.71
UKIP	John Beacham	107	2.79	N/A
Turnout		3,831	44.74	
Conservative hold		Swing	▲11.27	

St. Stephen
Party	Candidate	Votes	%	±%
Green	Matthew Jenkins	1,554	53.05	▲10.61
Conservative	Alan Feeney	855	28.32	▼4.44
Labour	Saiful Islam	477	15.80	▼9.0
UKIP	Paul Boyles	133	4.41	N/A
Turnout		3,019	38.27	
Green hold		Swing	▲7.53	

Warndon Parish
Party	Candidate	Votes	%	±%
Conservative	Andy Roberts	1,564	58.69	▲6.64
Labour Co-op	Paul Mountain	596	22.36	▲1.46
Liberal Democrats	Darrell Butler	215	8.07	N/A
UKIP	Jacqueline Burnett	154	5.78	▼22.14
Green	Alison Morgan	136	5.10	▼4.03
Turnout		2,665	30.94	
Conservative hold		Swing	▲14.39	

=== Wychavon ===
Bowbrook
Party	Candidate	Votes	%	±%
Conservative	Tony Miller	2,152	69.02	▲22.77
Labour	Steve Ainsworth	357	11.45	▼0.76
Liberal Democrats	John Littlechild	354	11.35	▲3.22
UKIP	Peter Jewell	133	4.27	▼29.15
Green	Edward Cohen	122	3.91	N/A
Turnout		3,118	40.40	
Conservative hold		Swing	▲25.96	

Bredon
Party	Candidate	Votes	%	±%
Conservative	Adrian Hardman	2,371	72.20	▲14.54
Liberal Democrats	Elizabeth Turier	465	14.16	▲2.53
Labour	David Niblett	236	7.19	▼2.62
Green	Katri Hastings	212	6.46	N/A
Turnout		3,284	42.57	
Conservative hold		Swing	▲17.72	

Broadway
Party	Candidate	Votes	%	±%
Conservative	Liz Eyre	1,858	72.69	▼0.54
Liberal Democrats	Diana Brown	317	12.40	▼1.43
Labour	Martin Vernall	217	8.49	▼4.46
Green	Matthew Collins	164	6.42	N/A
Turnout		2,556	38.31	
Conservative hold		Swing	▼0.99	

Droitwich East
Party	Candidate	Votes	%	±%
Conservative	Bob Brookes	1,981	67.38	▲32.63
Liberal Democrats	Margaret Rowley	419	14.25	▲1.16
Labour	Val Humphries	415	14.12	▼5.17
Green	Jane Zurek	125	4.25	▼0.82
Turnout		2,940	37.55	
Conservative hold		Swing	▲30.22	

Droitwich West
Party	Candidate	Votes	%	±%
Conservative	Richard Morris	1,105	53.41	▲16.60
Labour	Alan Humphries	510	24.65	▼0.40
Liberal Democrats	Rod Hopkins	287	13.87	▲7.97
Green	Neil Franks	167	8.07	N/A
Turnout		2,067	27.57	
Conservative hold		Swing	▲24.42	

Evesham North West
Party	Candidate	Votes	%	±%
Conservative	John Smith	1,160	51.95	▲10.14
Labour	Michael Worrall	456	20.42	▲10.24
Liberal Democrats	Tim Haines	384	17.20	▲7.57
Green	Patricia Buckland	233	10.43	N/A
Turnout		2,233	26.96	
Conservative hold		Swing	▲24.26	

Evesham South
Party	Candidate	Votes	%	±%
Conservative	Bob Banks	1,453	59.28	▲6.46
Labour	Mary Campbell	493	20.11	▲0.94
Liberal Democrats	Julie Haines	228	11.51	▼4.20
Green	Fay Whitfield	223	9.10	N/A
Turnout		2,451	26.31	
Conservative hold		Swing	▲3.70	

Harvington
Party	Candidate	Votes	%	±%
Conservative	Anthony Hopkins	2,056	67.37	▼6.26
Labour	John Gowers	400	13.11	▼13.26
Liberal Democrats	Jack Parsons	269	8.81	N/A
UKIP	Harry Cottam	181	5.93	N/A
Green	Sarah Cohen	146	4.78	N/A
Turnout		3,052	39.48	
Conservative hold		Swing	▼9.76	

Littletons
Party	Candidate	Votes	%	±%
Conservative	Alastair Adams	1,991	63.37	▲14.45
Liberal Democrats	Keith Wright	582	18.52	▼21.73
Labour	Viv Eden	381	12.13	▲1.30
Green	Patrick Hogan	188	5.98	N/A
Turnout		3,142	34.18	
Conservative hold		Swing	▲18.09	

Ombersley
Party	Candidate	Votes	%	±%
Conservative	Peter Tomlinson	2,153	77.31	▲29.33
Liberal Democrats	Peter Evans	285	10.23	▲5.07
Labour	Charlie Chan	242	8.69	▲0.11
Green	Nicola Porter	105	3.77	▼1.32
Turnout		2,785	33.19	
Conservative hold		Swing	▲31.27	

Pershore
Party	Candidate	Votes	%	±%
Liberal Democrats	Liz Tucker	2,005	57.83	▲4.30
Conservative	Linda Robinson	1,219	35.16	▲13.26
Green	Nina Freund	243	7.01	N/A
Turnout		3,467	41.48	
Liberal Democrats hold		Swing	▼8.78	

Upton Snodsbury
Party	Candidate	Votes	%	±%
Conservative	Rob Adams	2,168	73.29	▲16.27
Liberal Democrats	Adrian Key	272	9.20	▲2.85
Labour	Chris Knight	245	8.28	▲1.05
UKIP	Jonathan Burrow	140	4.73	▼20.24
Green	Mike Parker	133	4.50	▲0.08
Turnout		2,958	38.72	
Conservative hold		Swing	▲18.26	

=== Wyre Forest ===
Bewdley
Party	Candidate	Votes	%	±%
Conservative	Rebecca Vale	1,305	46.02	▲13.70
Labour	Rod Stanczyszyn	488	17.21	▼2.00
Health Concern	Calne Edginton-White	474	16.71	▼2.99
Independent	Jim Lawson	166	5.85	N/A
Liberal Democrats	Rachel Akathiotis	149	5.25	N/A
UKIP	Chris Wood	146	5.15	▼19.52
Green	Anna Coleman	108	3.81	▼0.28
Turnout		2,836	38.70	
Conservative hold		Swing	▲16.61	

Chaddesley
Party	Candidate	Votes	%	±%
Conservative	Marcus Hart	1,236	45.56	▲16.54
Independent	Helen Dyke	973	35.94	▼10.24
Labour	Dave Jones	206	7.59	▼1.85
Health Concern	Keith Robertson	129	4.75	▼9.25
UKIP	Phil Daniels	90	3.32	▼18.52
Green	Doug Hine	77	2.84	N/A
Turnout		2,713	38.68	
Conservative hold		Swing	▲13.39	

Cookley, Wolverley and Wribbenhall
Party	Candidate	Votes	%	±%
Conservative	Ian Hardiman	1,087	38.32	▲4.43
Independent	Gordon Yarranton	554	19.53	N/A
Labour	Owen Raybould	491	17.31	▼9.34
Health Concern	Linda Candlin	355	12.51	▼2.68
UKIP	David Field	142	5.01	▼15.26
Green	Kate Spohrer	129	4.55	▲1.83
Liberal Democrats	Michael Akathiotis	79	2.78	N/A
Turnout		2,837	36.50	
Conservative hold		Swing	▲6.89	

St. Barnabas
Party	Candidate	Votes	%	±%
Conservative	Anne Hingley	1,405	53.79	▲21.71
Labour	Nigel Knowles	898	34.38	▲7.06
UKIP	William Hopkins	165	6.32	▼11.84
Liberal Democrats	Heidi Worth	89	3.41	▲1.71
Green	Martin Layton	55	2.11	N/A
Turnout		2,612	33.99	
Conservative hold		Swing	▲14.39	

St. Chads
Party	Candidate	Votes	%	±%
Liberal Democrats	Frances Oborski	937	41.59	N/A
Conservative	Julian Phillips	668	29.65	▲14.79
Labour	Nick Savage	355	15.76	▲4.43
UKIP	Martin Stooke	209	9.28	▼10.72
Green	Brett Caulfield	84	3.73	▲1.94
UKIP	Chris Wood	146	5.15	▼19.52
Turnout		2,253	30.95	
Liberal Democrats gain from Liberal		Swing	▲9.45	

St. Georges and St. Oswald
Party	Candidate	Votes	%	±%
Health Concern	Mary Rayner	739	34.86	▲6.02
Conservative	Kevin Gale	483	22.78	▲8.43
Liberal Democrats	Shazu Miah	369	17.41	N/A
Labour	Mumshad Ahmed	340	16.04	▼7.66
UKIP	Sophie Edginton	111	5.24	▼21.20
Green	Dave Finch	78	3.68	▲0.50
Turnout		2,120	28.06	
Health Concern hold		Swing	▲13.61	

St. Johns
Party	Candidate	Votes	%	±%
Conservative	Tracey Onslow	987	46.73	▲15.88
Labour	Bernadette Connor	365	17.28	▼3.42
Health Concern	Sue Meekings	361	17.09	▲2.22
Liberal Democrats	Clare Cassidy	180	8.52	N/A
UKIP	Craig Leonard	143	6.77	▼15.31
Green	Vicky Lea	76	3.60	▲1.95
Turnout		2,112	28.34	
Conservative hold		Swing	▲15.60	

St. Marys
Party	Candidate	Votes	%	±%
Conservative	Nathan Desmond	978	43.104	▲17.97
Labour	Gareth Webster	504	22.21	▼1.16
UKIP	George Connolly	273	12.03	▼15.40
Health Concern	Peter Young	235	10.36	▼5.13
Liberal Democrats	Adrian Beavis	203	8.95	N/A
Green	John Davis	76	3.35	▲1.23
Turnout		2,269	24.65	
Conservative gain from UKIP		Swing	▲16.69	

Stourport-on-Severn
Party	Candidate	Votes	%	±%
Conservative	Chris Rogers	1,952	39.93	
Conservative	Paul Harrison	1,745	35.70	
Labour	Cliff Brewer	1,151	23.55	
Health Concern	John Thomas	1,099	22.48	
Health Concern	Nicky Martin	1,084	22.18	
Labour	Jill Hawes	1,034	21.15	
UKIP	John Holden	491	10.05	
UKIP	Berenice Dawes	421	8.61	
Liberal Democrats	Simon Ford	204	4.17	N/A
Liberal Democrats	Chris Pratt	174	3.56	N/A
Green	Nicholas Atkinson	111	2.27	
Green	Phil Oliver	98	2.00	
Turnout		9,564	30.26	
Conservative gain from UKIP		Swing	▲9.82	
Conservative gain from Health Concern		Swing	▲5.48	

== By-elections ==
=== Bromsgrove South ===
Labour councillor Chris Bloore resigned in 2019 after his election in 2017 to work in Toronto, Canada. Bloore's resignation triggered a by-election on 31 October 2019 in which Labour lost the seat to the Conservatives, dropping to fourth place on a 32.2% swing against Labour.
