= 2008 Worcester City Council election =

2008 UK local government election

Map of the results of the 2008 Worcester council election. Conservatives in blue, Labour in red, independents in light grey and Liberal Democrats in yellow. Wards in dark grey were not contested in 2008.

The 2008 Worcester City Council election took place on 1 May 2008 to elect members of Worcester City Council in Worcestershire, England. One third of the council was up for election and the council stayed under no overall control.

After the election, the composition of the council was:

- Conservative 17
- Labour 13
- Liberal Democrat 3
- Independent 2

== Campaign ==
Before the election the Conservatives ran the council as a minority administration, and required one extra seat in order to win a majority. They had lost their majority after Labour gained a seat from them in a by-election in 2007. 12 seats were up for election with 5 Conservative, 4 Labour, 2 independent and 1 Liberal Democrat seats being contested. The Conservatives only contested 10 of the 12 seats after they decided not to oppose the two independents who were up for re-election in Nunnery and St John wards, however both they and the independent councillors denied that any deal had been done.

Three members of the Shadow Cabinet, including the Shadow Chancellor George Osborne, visited Worcester to campaign for the Conservatives.

== Election result ==
The results saw the council remain without any party having a majority with the Conservatives continuing to run the administration. They had come within 28 votes of winning in Arboretum ward but Labour's Joy Squires held the seat.

The Green Party contested ten of the twelve seats, falling back slightly overall from 9.2 to 8.5% of the vote. Its claim of 10% related to the seats it contested. While it failed to win a seat, its best results were in the Rainbow Hill and Cathedral wards, where it scored 23.3 and 18.6% respectively.

Worcester local election result 2008
Party	Seats	Gains	Losses	Net gain/loss	Seats %	Votes %	Votes	+/−
Conservative	5	0	0	0	41.7	37.4	7,868	-5.5%
Labour	4	0	0	0	33.3	28.4	5,982	+3.1%
Independent	2	0	0	0	16.7	10.3	2,164	+5.5%
Liberal Democrats	1	0	0	0	8.3	10.5	2,215	-2.5%
Green	0	0	0	0	0	8.5	1,790	-1.2%
BNP	0	0	0	0	0	4.3	899	+0.6%
UKIP	0	0	0	0	0	0.7	146	+0.1%

== Ward results ==
Arboretum
Party	Candidate	Votes	%	±%
Labour	Joy Squires	728	39.2	−4.0
Conservative	David Wilkinson	700	37.7	+8.3
Liberal Democrats	Ken Carpenter	157	8.5	−4.5
Green	Martin Sullivan	138	7.4	−0.2
BNP	Jack Amos	134	7.2	+7.2
Majority		28	1.5	−12.3
Turnout		1,857	41.0	−1.0
Labour hold		Swing		

Battenhall
Party	Candidate	Votes	%	±%
Conservative	Robert Rowden	1,021	64.9	+7.9
Labour	Lian Rees	341	21.7	+0.7
Green	Jan Dyer	211	13.4	+3.8
Majority		680	43.2	+7.2
Turnout		1,573	38.4	−4.7
Conservative hold		Swing		

Bedwardine
Party	Candidate	Votes	%	±%
Conservative	Derek Prodger	1,369	63.5	+7.1
Labour	Christopher Winwood	350	16.2	−4.4
Liberal Democrats	Vaughan Hencher	240	11.1	−2.7
Green	Clive Matthews	198	9.2	+0.1
Majority		1,019	47.3	+11.5
Turnout		2,157	34.5	−2.8
Conservative hold		Swing		

Cathedral
Party	Candidate	Votes	%	±%
Conservative	Francis Lankester	1,154	56.0	+5.0
Labour	Rachel Hall	521	25.3	+3.7
Green	Louis Stephen	384	18.6	+4.5
Majority		633	30.7	+1.3
Turnout		2,059	30.3	−4.9
Conservative hold		Swing		

Claines
Party	Candidate	Votes	%	±%
Liberal Democrats	Sue Askin	1,551	53.1	−1.6
Conservative	Nicholas Turner	1,005	34.4	+3.4
Green	Peter Robinson	195	6.7	+0.1
Labour	Jane McCann	171	5.9	−1.8
Majority		546	18.7	−5.0
Turnout		2,922	45.0	−4.0
Liberal Democrats hold		Swing		

Gorse Hill
Party	Candidate	Votes	%	±%
Labour	Roger Berry	515	45.3	+1.3
BNP	Lee Hancock	282	24.8	+0.3
Conservative	David Nolan	243	21.4	+6.6
Green	Linda Smith	98	8.6	+3.0
Majority		233	20.5	+1.0
Turnout		1,138	27.0	−6.0
Labour hold		Swing		

Nunnery
Party	Candidate	Votes	%	±%
Independent	Michael Layland	1,115	48.1	+17.4
Labour	Vanessa Mann	707	30.5	−4.7
BNP	Tom Amos	353	15.2	+2.5
Green	Alexander Gwinn	141	6.1	+0.2
Majority		408	17.6	
Turnout		2,316	39.0	+0.6
Independent hold		Swing		

Rainbow Hill
Party	Candidate	Votes	%	±%
Labour	Adrian Gregson	443	44.1	−4.6
Conservative	Lesley Auden	327	32.6	+12.7
Green	Ruth Stafford	234	23.3	−8.1
Majority		116	11.5	−5.8
Turnout		1,004	24.2	−0.9
Labour hold		Swing		

St Clement
Party	Candidate	Votes	%	±%
Conservative	Simon Geraghty	876	51.9	+2.5
Labour	Richard Bird	451	26.7	+3.7
UKIP	John Butterfield	146	8.7	+8.7
BNP	Peter Beechey	130	7.7	−8.1
Green	Olaf Twiehaus	84	5.0	−6.8
Majority		425	25.2	−1.2
Turnout		1,687	37.7	−1.8
Conservative hold		Swing		

St John
Party	Candidate	Votes	%	±%
Independent	Margaret Layland	1,049	53.7	+37.8
Labour	Richard Udall	905	46.3	+4.0
Majority		144	7.4	
Turnout		1,954	33.9	−0.6
Independent hold		Swing		

St Stephen
Party	Candidate	Votes	%	±%
Conservative	Keith Burton	802	57.7	−2.3
Liberal Democrats	Eddie Hartley	267	19.2	+6.6
Labour	George Squires	215	15.5	−3.8
Green	Penelope Asquith	107	7.7	−0.5
Majority		535	38.5	−2.2
Turnout		1,391	34.3	−3.1
Conservative hold		Swing		

Warndon
Party	Candidate	Votes	%	±%
Labour	Alan Amos	635	63.1	+10.0
Conservative	Robert Campbell	371	36.9	+8.1
Majority		264	26.2	+1.9
Turnout		1,006	25.6	+0.8
Labour hold		Swing		
