= 2013 Worcestershire County Council election =

2013 UK local government election

| ← 2009 | 2 May 2013 | 2017 → |

All 57 council division seats 29 seats needed for a majority
| | First party | Second party |
|---|---|---|
| Party | Conservative | Labour |
| Seats won | 30 | 12 |
| Seat change | ▼12 | ▲9 |
| | Third party | Fourth party |
| Party | UKIP | Liberal Democrats |
| Seats won | 4 | 3 |
| Seat change | ▲4 | ▼5 |
- Map showing the results of the 2013 Worcestershire County Council election. Striped divisions have mixed representation.
Council control before election
Conservative
Council control after election
Conservative

An election to Worcestershire County Council took place on 2 May 2013 as part of the 2013 United Kingdom local elections. 57 councillors were elected from 53 electoral divisions, which returned either one or two county councillors each by first-past-the-post voting for a four-year term of office. The divisions were the same as those used at the previous election in 2009. The election saw the Conservative Party retain overall control of the council with a significantly reduced majority of just 2 seats.

All locally registered electors (British, Commonwealth and European Union citizens) who were aged 18 or over on Thursday 2 May 2013 were entitled to vote in the local elections. Those who were temporarily away from their ordinary address (for example, away working, on holiday, in student accommodation or in hospital) were also entitled to vote in the local elections, although those who had moved abroad and registered as overseas electors cannot vote in the local elections. It is possible to register to vote at more than one address (such as a university student who had a term-time address and lives at home during holidays) at the discretion of the local Electoral Register Office, but it remains an offence to vote more than once in the same local government election.

== Summary ==
The Conservative Party retained control of the council with a majority of two seats. The Labour Party, who had in 2009 won a total of 3 seats, became the official opposition with a total of 12 seats.

UKIP became the third largest party, gaining 4 seats. The Liberal Democrats, who formed the official opposition prior to the election, won three seats, a net loss of five.

The Independent Kidderminster Hospital and Health Concern and the Green Party both won two seats, while the Wythall Residents Association and continuation Liberal Party won one seat each.

== Results ==
Worcestershire County Council Election Overall Result 2013
| Party | Seats | Gains | Losses | Net gain/loss | Seats % | Votes % | Votes | +/− |
|---|---|---|---|---|---|---|---|---|
| Conservative | 30 | 4 | 16 | –12 | 52.6 | 33.3 | 52,609 | |
| Labour | 12 | 9 | 0 | +9 | 21.1 | 23.9 | 37,821 | |
| UKIP | 4 | 4 | 0 | +4 | 7.0 | 20.4 | 32,285 | |
| Liberal Democrats | 3 | 0 | 5 | –5 | 5.3 | 7.7 | 12,098 | |
| Green | 2 | 2 | 0 | +2 | 3.5 | 5.0 | 7,942 | |
| Health Concern | 2 | 1 | 1 | 0 | 3.5 | 3.9 | 6,236 | |
| Independent | 2 | 2 | 0 | +2 | 3.5 | 2.7 | 4,259 | |
| Liberal | 1 | 0 | 0 | 0 | 1.8 | 0.8 | 1,233 | |
| Wythall Residents' Association | 1 | 0 | 0 | 0 | 1.8 | 0.7 | 1,083 | |
| BNP | 0 | 0 | 0 | 0 | 0 | 0.9 | 1,386 | |
| Independent Ratepayers & Residents Association | 0 | 0 | 0 | 0 | 0 | 0.5 | 784 | |
| TUSC | 0 | 0 | 0 | 0 | 0 | 0.1 | 177 | |
| Not specified | 0 | 0 | 0 | 0 | 0 | 0.04 | 62 | |
| Total | 57 | | | | | | 157,975 | |

== Results by electoral division ==
=== Bromsgrove ===
Alvechurch
| Party | Candidate | Votes | % | ±% |
|---|---|---|---|---|
| Conservative | June Griffiths | 709 | 30.1 | |
| UKIP | Julie Flynn | 632 | 26.9 | |
| Independent | Terence Coney | 596 | 25.3 | |
| Labour | Rosalind Cooke | 280 | 11.9 | |
| Green | Peter Harvey | 124 | 5.3 | |
| BNP | Jade Murphy | 12 | 0.5 | |
| Turnout | | 2,357 | 31.1 | |
| Conservative hold | | | | |

Beacon
| Party | Candidate | Votes | % | ±% |
|---|---|---|---|---|
| Labour | Peter McDonald | 1,374 | 47.6 | |
| Conservative | Richard Deeming | 1,035 | 35.8 | |
| Green | Gillian Harvey | 306 | 10.6 | |
| BNP | Elizabeth Wainwright | 173 | 6.0 | |
| Turnout | | 2,909 | 31.5 | |
| Labour hold | | | | |

Bromsgrove Central
| Party | Candidate | Votes | % | ±% |
|---|---|---|---|---|
| Conservative | Anthony Blagg | 835 | 35.0 | |
| Labour | Margaret Buxton | 668 | 28.0 | |
| UKIP | George Flynn | 624 | 26.2 | |
| Liberal Democrats | Joseph Hearn | 141 | 5.9 | |
| Green | Robert Hanna | 89 | 3.7 | |
| BNP | Kaine Llewellyn | 29 | 1.2 | |
| Turnout | | 2,392 | 31.0 | |
| Conservative hold | | | | |

Bromsgrove East
| Party | Candidate | Votes | % | ±% |
|---|---|---|---|---|
| Conservative | Christopher Taylor | 952 | 39.1 | |
| UKIP | Owen Davies | 638 | 26.2 | |
| Labour Co-op | Rory Shannon | 426 | 17.5 | |
| Liberal Democrats | Janet King | 400 | 16.4 | |
| BNP | Donald Bates | 19 | 0.8 | |
| Turnout | | 2,443 | 31.1 | |
| Conservative hold | | | | |

Bromsgrove South
| Party | Candidate | Votes | % | ±% |
|---|---|---|---|---|
| Labour Co-op | Christopher Bloore | 1,088 | 48.5 | |
| Conservative | Rodney Laight | 733 | 32.7 | |
| Green | Paul Roberts | 166 | 7.4 | |
| BNP | David Dolphin | 163 | 7.3 | |
| Liberal Democrats | Thomas Coe | 93 | 4.1 | |
| Turnout | | 2,268 | 26.6 | |
| Labour Co-op gain from Conservative | | | | |

Bromsgrove West
| Party | Candidate | Votes | % | ±% |
|---|---|---|---|---|
| Labour Co-op | Luke Mallett | 1,200 | 52.3 | |
| Conservative | Diane Campbell | 495 | 21.6 | |
| Health Concern | David Pardoe | 399 | 17.4 | |
| BNP | Donna Smith | 145 | 6.3 | |
| Liberal Democrats | Michael Mihailovic | 57 | 2.5 | |
| Turnout | | 2,311 | 29.0 | |
| Labour Co-op gain from Conservative | | | | |

Clent Hills
| Party | Candidate | Votes | % | ±% |
|---|---|---|---|---|
| Independent | Rachel Jenkins | 1,388 | 46.8 | |
| Conservative | William Moore | 873 | 29.5 | |
| UKIP | Stanley Francis | 500 | 16.9 | |
| Labour | Thomas Stanley | 192 | 6.5 | |
| BNP | Jason Dolphin | 11 | 0.4 | |
| Turnout | | 2,971 | 32.6 | |
| Independent gain from Conservative | | | | |

Woodvale
| Party | Candidate | Votes | % | ±% |
|---|---|---|---|---|
| Conservative | Sheila Blagg | 1,204 | 51.4 | |
| Labour | Bernard McEldowney | 805 | 34.4 | |
| Green | Julian Gray | 332 | 14.2 | |
| Turnout | | 2,373 | 27.1 | |
| Conservative hold | | | | |

Wythall
| Party | Candidate | Votes | % | ±% |
|---|---|---|---|---|
| Wythall Residents' Association | Stephen Peters | 1,083 | 51.1 | |
| Conservative | Mark Bullivant | 688 | 32.4 | |
| Labour | Alan Clewlow | 220 | 10.4 | |
| BNP | Peter Tomkinson | 90 | 4.2 | |
| Liberal Democrats | Sandra Docker | 40 | 1.9 | |
| Turnout | | 2,132 | 27.8 | |
| Wythall Residents' Association hold | | | | |

=== Malvern Hills ===
Croome
| Party | Candidate | Votes | % | ±% |
|---|---|---|---|---|
| Independent | Roger Sutton | 724 | 33.3 | |
| Conservative | Bronwen Behan | 653 | 30.0 | |
| UKIP | Jeanette Sheen | 583 | 26.8 | |
| Labour | Leslie Roberts | 217 | 10.0 | |
| Turnout | | 2,181 | 31.2 | |
| Independent gain from Conservative | | | | |

Hallow
| Party | Candidate | Votes | % | ±% |
|---|---|---|---|---|
| Conservative | Phil Grove | 1,033 | 38.0 | |
| UKIP | Mike O'Leary | 813 | 29.9 | |
| Independent | Dean Clarke | 660 | 24.2 | |
| Labour Co-op | Simon Cronin | 216 | 7.9 | |
| Turnout | | 2,726 | 36.2 | |
| Conservative hold | | | | |

Malvern Chase
| Party | Candidate | Votes | % | ±% |
|---|---|---|---|---|
| Conservative | Lucy Hodgson | 819 | 29.7 | |
| Liberal Democrats | Martin Lawrence | 792 | 28.7 | |
| UKIP | Mike Soley | 624 | 22.6 | |
| Labour | Jill Smith | 292 | 10.6 | |
| Green | Jan Dyer | 230 | 8.3 | |
| Turnout | | 2,768 | 36.1 | |
| Conservative gain from Liberal Democrats | | | | |

Malvern Langland
| Party | Candidate | Votes | % | ±% |
|---|---|---|---|---|
| Conservative | Ian Hopwood | 499 | 24.7 | |
| UKIP | Richard Spencer | 496 | 24.6 | |
| Liberal Democrats | Cathy Jackson-Read | 472 | 23.4 | |
| Labour | Daniel Walton | 276 | 13.7 | |
| Green | William Jenkins | 178 | 8.8 | |
| Independent | Caroline Bovey | 98 | 4.9 | |
| Turnout | | 2,027 | 26.4 | |
| Conservative gain from Liberal Democrats | | | | |

Malvern Link
| Party | Candidate | Votes | % | ±% |
|---|---|---|---|---|
| Conservative | Paul Tuthill | 863 | 34.4 | |
| UKIP | Mike Savage | 690 | 27.5 | |
| Green | Clive Smith | 442 | 17.6 | |
| Labour | John Gallagher | 348 | 13.9 | |
| Liberal Democrats | Brian Regimbeau | 163 | 6.5 | |
| Turnout | | 2,511 | 31.4 | |
| Conservative gain from Liberal Democrats | | | | |

Malvern Trinity
| Party | Candidate | Votes | % | ±% |
|---|---|---|---|---|
| Green | John Raine | 535 | 24.9 | |
| UKIP | Richard Chamings | 530 | 24.6 | |
| Conservative | David Watkins | 475 | 22.1 | |
| Liberal Democrats | Beverley Nielsen | 420 | 19.5 | |
| Labour | John Rye | 191 | 8.9 | |
| Turnout | | 2,158 | 32.3 | |
| Green gain from Liberal Democrats | | | | |

Powick
| Party | Candidate | Votes | % | ±% |
|---|---|---|---|---|
| Liberal Democrats | Tom Wells | 1,946 | 67.1 | |
| Conservative | Robert Kerby | 438 | 15.1 | |
| UKIP | David Barrie | 364 | 12.6 | |
| Labour | Christopher Burrows | 94 | 3.2 | |
| Green | Peter Nielsen | 58 | 2.0 | |
| Turnout | | 2,904 | 37.7 | |
| Liberal Democrats hold | | | | |

Tenbury
| Party | Candidate | Votes | % | ±% |
|---|---|---|---|---|
| Conservative | Ken Pollock | 1,373 | 55.4 | |
| UKIP | Malcolm Delingpole | 633 | 25.5 | |
| Labour | Michael Wilson | 257 | 10.4 | |
| Green | Robert Dowler | 216 | 8.7 | |
| Turnout | | 2,492 | 30.7 | |
| Conservative hold | | | | |

=== Redditch Borough ===
Arrow Valley East (2 seats)
| Party | Candidate | Votes | % | ±% |
|---|---|---|---|---|
| UKIP | Martin Jenkins | 1,792 | 36.2 | |
| Labour | Joseph Baker | 1,543 | 31.2 | |
| UKIP | Irene Stickley | 1,511 | 30.5 | |
| Labour | Philip Mould | 1,426 | 28.8 | |
| Conservative | Juliet Brunner | 1,176 | 23.7 | |
| Conservative | Gay Hopkins | 989 | 20.0 | |
| Independent | Paul Swansborough | 213 | 4.3 | |
| Liberal Democrats | David Gee | 198 | 4.0 | |
| Green | Emma Bradley | 188 | 3.8 | |
| Liberal Democrats | Simon Oliver | 171 | 3.5 | |
| BNP | Ashley Bradley | 164 | 3.3 | |
| Green | Lee Bradley | 128 | 2.6 | |
| Turnout | | 4,966 | 28.5 | |
| UKIP gain from Conservative | | | | |
| Labour gain from Conservative | | | | |

Arrow Valley West (2 seats)
| Party | Candidate | Votes | % | ±% |
|---|---|---|---|---|
| Labour | Andrew Fry | 1,752 | 41.8 | |
| Labour | Patricia Lailey | 1,604 | 38.3 | |
| UKIP | Scott Preston | 1,395 | 33.3 | |
| Conservative | Thomas Baker-Price | 985 | 23.5 | |
| Conservative | Kathleen Haslam | 877 | 20.9 | |
| Green | Kevin White | 263 | 6.3 | |
| Liberal Democrats | Anthony Pitt | 215 | 5.1 | |
| Liberal Democrats | Ian Webster | 197 | 4.7 | |
| Green | Rylma White | 169 | 4.0 | |
| Turnout | | 4,194 | 27.4 | |
| Labour gain from Conservative | | | | |
| Labour gain from Conservative | | | | |

Redditch North (2 seats)
| Party | Candidate | Votes | % | ±% |
|---|---|---|---|---|
| Labour | Graham Vickery | 1,598 | 35.9 | |
| Labour | Robin Lunn | 1,595 | 35.8 | |
| Conservative | Brandon Clayton | 1,219 | 27.4 | |
| UKIP | Christopher Harrison | 1,183 | 26.6 | |
| UKIP | Matthew Headford | 1,164 | 26.1 | |
| Conservative | David Thain | 1,109 | 24.9 | |
| Green | Louise Deveney | 221 | 5.0 | |
| Liberal Democrats | Diane Thomas | 145 | 3.3 | |
| Green | Beverley Minto | 143 | 3.2 | |
| Liberal Democrats | John Stanley | 133 | 3.0 | |
| Turnout | | 4,463 | 29.4 | |
| Labour gain from Conservative | | | | |
| Labour gain from Conservative | | | | |

Redditch South (2 seats)
| Party | Candidate | Votes | % | ±% |
|---|---|---|---|---|
| Conservative | William Gretton | 1,663 | 33.2 | |
| UKIP | Stuart Cross | 1,652 | 33.0 | |
| Conservative | Jane Potter | 1,594 | 31.8 | |
| UKIP | Paul White | 1,402 | 28.0 | |
| Labour | Everton Ebanks | 1,312 | 26.2 | |
| Labour | John Witherspoon | 1,200 | 23.9 | |
| Green | Rosemary Kerry | 266 | 5.3 | |
| Liberal Democrats | Rita Hindle | 218 | 4.3 | |
| Green | Alistair Waugh | 184 | 3.7 | |
| Liberal Democrats | Edward Killworth | 152 | 3.0 | |
| Turnout | | 5,019 | 30.7 | |
| Conservative hold | | | | |
| UKIP gain from Conservative | | | | |

=== Worcester City ===
Bedwardine
| Party | Candidate | Votes | % | ±% |
|---|---|---|---|---|
| Conservative | Derek Prodger | 847 | 39.0 | |
| UKIP | Percival Owen | 546 | 25.1 | |
| Labour | Christopher Cooper | 497 | 22.9 | |
| Green | Annie O'Dell | 114 | 5.2 | |
| Liberal Democrats | Mike Mullins | 113 | 5.2 | |
| TUSC | Peter McNally | 39 | 1.8 | |
| BNP | Jennifer Whitwam | 16 | 0.7 | |
| Turnout | | 2,181 | 30.8 | |
| Conservative hold | | | | |

Claines
| Party | Candidate | Votes | % | ±% |
|---|---|---|---|---|
| Liberal Democrats | Sue Askin | 972 | 33.6 | |
| Conservative | Mike Whitehouse | 858 | 29.7 | |
| UKIP | Stephen Delevante | 524 | 18.1 | |
| Labour | Matthew Willis | 338 | 11.7 | |
| Green | Peter Robinson | 198 | 6.9 | |
| Turnout | | 2,894 | 38.2 | |
| Liberal Democrats hold | | | | |

Gorse Hill and Warndon
| Party | Candidate | Votes | % | ±% |
|---|---|---|---|---|
| Labour | Alan Amos | 1,037 | 52.2 | |
| UKIP | James Goad | 619 | 31.2 | |
| Conservative | Simon Harrison | 232 | 11.7 | |
| Green | Justin Kirby | 99 | 5.0 | |
| Turnout | | 1,993 | 24.6 | |
| Labour hold | | | | |

Nunnery
| Party | Candidate | Votes | % | ±% |
|---|---|---|---|---|
| Labour Co-op | Pat Agar | 1,059 | 51.1 | |
| Conservative | Keith Burton | 634 | 30.6 | |
| BNP | Carl Mason | 201 | 9.7 | |
| Green | Barbara Mitra | 177 | 8.5 | |
| Turnout | | 2,082 | 31.0 | |
| Labour Co-op gain from Conservative | | | | |

Rainbow Hill
| Party | Candidate | Votes | % | ±% |
|---|---|---|---|---|
| Labour Co-op | Paul Denham | 973 | 45.4 | |
| Conservative | Allah Ditta | 595 | 27.8 | |
| UKIP | Carl Humphries | 414 | 19.3 | |
| Green | Nicholas Weeks | 137 | 6.4 | |
| TUSC | Ruthie McNally | 23 | 1.1 | |
| Turnout | | 2,150 | 30.2 | |
| Labour Co-op gain from Conservative | | | | |

Riverside
| Party | Candidate | Votes | % | ±% |
|---|---|---|---|---|
| Conservative | Simon Geraghty | 999 | 38.9 | |
| Labour | Lynn Denham | 868 | 33.8 | |
| UKIP | Richard Delingpole | 468 | 18.2 | |
| Green | Louis Stephen | 175 | 6.8 | |
| BNP | Julie Whitwam | 32 | 1.2 | |
| TUSC | Sean McCauley | 23 | 0.9 | |
| Turnout | | 2,574 | 28.5 | |
| Conservative hold | | | | |

St John
| Party | Candidate | Votes | % | ±% |
|---|---|---|---|---|
| Labour Co-op | Richard Udall | 982 | 59.7 | |
| Conservative | Ben Walker | 350 | 21.3 | |
| Green | Olaf Twiehaus | 116 | 7.1 | |
| BNP | Alan Draper | 86 | 5.2 | |
| No Description | Kenneth Holtom | 62 | 3.8 | |
| TUSC | Mark Davies | 48 | 3.0 | |
| Turnout | | 1,652 | 28.2 | |
| Labour Co-op hold | | | | |

St Peter
| Party | Candidate | Votes | % | ±% |
|---|---|---|---|---|
| Conservative | Marc Bayliss | 1,393 | 51.0 | |
| Labour | Adam Scott | 814 | 29.8 | |
| Green | Siobhan Wanklyn | 341 | 12.5 | |
| Liberal Democrats | Rory Roberson | 186 | 6.8 | |
| Turnout | | 2,760 | 31.0 | |
| Conservative hold | | | | |

St Stephen
| Party | Candidate | Votes | % | ±% |
|---|---|---|---|---|
| Green | Matthew Jenkins | 1,179 | 42.4 | |
| Conservative | Mary Drinkwater | 910 | 32.8 | |
| Labour | Geoffrey Williams | 689 | 24.8 | |
| Turnout | | 2,794 | 34.8 | |
| Green gain from Conservative | | | | |

Warndon Parish
| Party | Candidate | Votes | % | ±% |
|---|---|---|---|---|
| Conservative | Andrew Roberts | 958 | 42.1 | |
| UKIP | Steve Davis | 636 | 27.9 | |
| Labour | Steven Martin | 476 | 20.9 | |
| Green | Edward Hartley | 208 | 9.1 | |
| Turnout | | 2,283 | 26.7 | |
| Conservative hold | | | | |

=== Wychavon ===
Bowbrook
| Party | Candidate | Votes | % | ±% |
|---|---|---|---|---|
| Conservative | Tony Miller | 1,315 | 46.3 | |
| UKIP | Yuleen Jewell | 950 | 33.4 | |
| Labour | Sheila Seabourne | 347 | 12.2 | |
| Liberal Democrats | John Littlechild | 231 | 8.1 | |
| Turnout | | 2,847 | 37.8 | |
| Conservative hold | | | | |

Bredon
| Party | Candidate | Votes | % | ±% |
|---|---|---|---|---|
| Conservative | Adrian Hardman | 1,716 | 57.7 | |
| UKIP | Harvey Vivian | 622 | 20.9 | |
| Liberal Democrats | Charles Tucker | 346 | 11.6 | |
| Labour | John Egan | 292 | 9.8 | |
| Turnout | | 2,984 | 38.1 | |
| Conservative hold | | | | |

Broadway
| Party | Candidate | Votes | % | ±% |
|---|---|---|---|---|
| Conservative | Liz Eyre | 1,499 | 73.2 | |
| Liberal Democrats | Diana Brown | 283 | 13.8 | |
| Labour | Gaynor Pritchard | 265 | 12.9 | |
| Turnout | | 2,091 | 31.4 | |
| Conservative hold | | | | |

Droitwich East
| Party | Candidate | Votes | % | ±% |
|---|---|---|---|---|
| Conservative | Pam Davey | 980 | 34.8 | |
| Independent Ratepayers & Residents Association | Nicole Carroll | 784 | 27.8 | |
| Labour | Edgar Harwood | 544 | 19.3 | |
| Liberal Democrats | Margaret Rowley | 369 | 13.1 | |
| Green | Rob Burkett | 143 | 5.1 | |
| Turnout | | 2,832 | 35.7 | |
| Conservative hold | | | | |

Droitwich West
| Party | Candidate | Votes | % | ±% |
|---|---|---|---|---|
| Conservative | Lynne Duffy | 798 | 36.8 | |
| UKIP | Neil Whelan | 699 | 32.2 | |
| Labour Co-op | Jenny Barnes | 543 | 25.0 | |
| Liberal Democrats | David Rowe | 128 | 5.9 | |
| Turnout | | 2,171 | 27.5 | |
| Conservative hold | | | | |

Evesham North West
| Party | Candidate | Votes | % | ±% |
|---|---|---|---|---|
| Conservative | John Smith | 842 | 41.8 | |
| UKIP | Ellis Tustin | 773 | 38.4 | |
| Labour | Steven Moralee | 205 | 10.2 | |
| Liberal Democrats | Timothy Haines | 194 | 9.6 | |
| Turnout | | 2,018 | 25.7 | |
| Conservative hold | | | | |

Evesham South
| Party | Candidate | Votes | % | ±% |
|---|---|---|---|---|
| Conservative | Bob Banks | 945 | 52.8 | |
| Labour | Alan Mason | 343 | 19.2 | |
| Liberal Democrats | Julie Haines | 281 | 15.7 | |
| BNP | Liam Hartland | 220 | 12.3 | |
| Turnout | | 1,807 | 21.4 | |
| Conservative hold | | | | |

Harvington
| Party | Candidate | Votes | % | ±% |
|---|---|---|---|---|
| Conservative | Clive Holt | 1,776 | 73.6 | |
| Labour | Michael Worrall | 636 | 26.4 | |
| Turnout | | 2,476 | 32.4 | |
| Conservative hold | | | | |

Littletons
| Party | Candidate | Votes | % | ±% |
|---|---|---|---|---|
| Conservative | Alastair Adams | 1,242 | 48.9 | |
| Liberal Democrats | Keith Wright | 1,022 | 40.3 | |
| Labour | Christine McDonald | 275 | 10.8 | |
| Turnout | | 2,576 | 30.0 | |
| Conservative gain from Liberal Democrats | | | | |

Ombersley
| Party | Candidate | Votes | % | ±% |
|---|---|---|---|---|
| Conservative | Maurice Broomfield | 1,292 | 48.0 | |
| UKIP | Doug Ingram | 894 | 33.2 | |
| Labour | Maurice Harford | 231 | 8.6 | |
| Liberal Democrats | Peter Evans | 139 | 5.2 | |
| Green | Steven Brown | 137 | 5.1 | |
| Turnout | | 2,695 | 32.8 | |
| Conservative hold | | | | |

Pershore
| Party | Candidate | Votes | % | ±% |
|---|---|---|---|---|
| Liberal Democrats | Liz Tucker | 1,677 | 53.5 | |
| Conservative | George Mackison | 686 | 21.9 | |
| UKIP | Mark Starr | 536 | 17.1 | |
| Labour | Ian Facer | 234 | 7.5 | |
| Turnout | | 3,148 | 38.4 | |
| Liberal Democrats hold | | | | |

Upton Snodsbury
| Party | Candidate | Votes | % | ±% |
|---|---|---|---|---|
| Conservative | Rob Adams | 1,482 | 57.0 | |
| UKIP | Richard Keel | 649 | 25.0 | |
| Labour | Monica Fry | 188 | 7.2 | |
| Liberal Democrats | Greg Thomas | 165 | 6.3 | |
| Green | Stephen Brohan | 115 | 4.4 | |
| Turnout | | 2,604 | 35.8 | |
| Conservative hold | | | | |

=== Wyre Forest ===
Bewdley
| Party | Candidate | Votes | % | ±% |
|---|---|---|---|---|
| Conservative | John-Paul Campion | 853 | 32.3 | |
| UKIP | Neil Jukes | 651 | 24.7 | |
| Health Concern | Derek Killingworth | 520 | 19.7 | |
| Labour | George Court | 507 | 19.2 | |
| Green | Phil Oliver | 108 | 4.1 | |
| Turnout | | 2,639 | 35.8 | |
| Conservative hold | | | | |

Chaddesley
| Party | Candidate | Votes | % | ±% |
|---|---|---|---|---|
| Conservative | Stephen Clee | 655 | 29.0 | |
| Independent | Helen Dyke | 580 | 25.7 | |
| UKIP | Bill Hopkins | 493 | 21.8 | |
| Health Concern | Harry Grove | 316 | 14.0 | |
| Labour | Gareth Webster | 213 | 9.4 | |
| Turnout | | 2,257 | 32.3 | |
| Conservative hold | | | | |

Cookley, Wolverley and Wribbenhall
| Party | Candidate | Votes | % | ±% |
|---|---|---|---|---|
| Conservative | Gordon Yarranton | 908 | 33.9 | |
| Labour | Chris Nicholls | 714 | 26.7 | |
| UKIP | Peter Willoughby | 543 | 20.3 | |
| Health Concern | Linda Candlin | 407 | 15.2 | |
| Green | Kate Spohrer | 73 | 2.7 | |
| Liberal | Rachel Akathiotis | 34 | 1.3 | |
| Turnout | | 2,679 | 33.8 | |
| Conservative hold | | | | |

St Barnabas
| Party | Candidate | Votes | % | ±% |
|---|---|---|---|---|
| Conservative | Anne Hingley | 735 | 32.1 | |
| Labour Co-op | Nigel Knowles | 626 | 27.3 | |
| Health Concern | Caroline Shellie | 431 | 18.8 | |
| UKIP | Mark Wright | 416 | 18.2 | |
| TUSC | Nigel Gilbert | 44 | 1.9 | |
| Liberal Democrats | Paul Preston | 39 | 1.7 | |
| Turnout | | 2,291 | 29.4 | |
| Conservative hold | | | | |

St Chads
| Party | Candidate | Votes | % | ±% |
|---|---|---|---|---|
| Liberal | Frances Oborski | 767 | 33.4 | |
| UKIP | Philip Daniels | 459 | 20.0 | |
| Health Concern | Christine Watkins | 402 | 17.5 | |
| Conservative | Paul Harrison | 341 | 14.9 | |
| Labour | Steve Walker | 260 | 11.3 | |
| Green | Victoria Lea | 41 | 1.8 | |
| BNP | Andrew North | 25 | 1.1 | |
| Turnout | | 2,295 | 30.6 | |
| Liberal hold | | | | |

St Georges and St Oswald
| Party | Candidate | Votes | % | ±% |
|---|---|---|---|---|
| Health Concern | Mary Rayner | 589 | 28.8 | |
| UKIP | Martin Stooke | 540 | 26.4 | |
| Labour | Howard Martin | 484 | 23.7 | |
| Conservative | John Aston | 293 | 14.3 | |
| Liberal | Esther Smart | 71 | 3.5 | |
| Green | Louise Ryan | 65 | 3.2 | |
| Turnout | | 2,042 | 26.5 | |
| Health Concern gain from Conservative | | | | |

St Johns
| Party | Candidate | Votes | % | ±% |
|---|---|---|---|---|
| Conservative | Marcus Hart | 693 | 30.9 | |
| UKIP | Michael Wrench | 496 | 22.1 | |
| Labour | Mike Kelly | 465 | 20.7 | |
| Health Concern | Nigel Thomas | 334 | 14.9 | |
| Liberal | David Hollyoak | 221 | 9.8 | |
| Green | Mike Whitbread | 37 | 1.6 | |
| Turnout | | 2,246 | 30.0 | |
| Conservative hold | | | | |

St Marys
| Party | Candidate | Votes | % | ±% |
|---|---|---|---|---|
| UKIP | Tony Baker | 595 | 27.4 | |
| Conservative | Nathan Desmond | 545 | 25.1 | |
| Labour | Mumshad Ahmed | 507 | 23.4 | |
| Health Concern | Graham Ballinger | 336 | 15.5 | |
| Liberal | Susan Meekings | 140 | 6.5 | |
| Green | Ronald Lee | 46 | 2.1 | |
| Turnout | | 2,169 | 24.6 | |
| UKIP gain from Conservative | | | | |

Stourport-on-Severn (2 seats)
| Party | Candidate | Votes | % | ±% |
|---|---|---|---|---|
| UKIP | Eric Kitson | 1,385 | 15.0 | |
| Health Concern | Jim Parish | 1,335 | 14.5 | |
| Health Concern | John Thomas | 1,167 | 12.7 | |
| UKIP | Claire Wright | 1,151 | 12.5 | |
| Labour | James Shaw | 1,141 | 12.4 | |
| Conservative | Ken Henderson | 984 | 10.7 | |
| Conservative | John Holden | 964 | 10.5 | |
| Labour | Carol Warren | 894 | 9.7 | |
| Green | Angela Hartwich | 195 | 2.1 | |
| Turnout | | 9,216 | 29.1 | |
| UKIP gain from Health Concern | | | | |
| Health Concern hold | | | | |
