= 2009 Worcestershire County Council election =

2009 UK local government election

| ← 2005 | 4 June 2009 | 2013 → |

All 57 council division seats 29 seats needed for a majority
| | First party | Second party | Third party |
|---|---|---|---|
| Party | Conservative | Liberal Democrats | Labour |
| Seats won | 42 | 8 | 3 |
| Seat change | ▲12 | Steady | ▼12 |
- 2009 local election results in Worcestershire
Council control before election
Conservative
Council control after election
Conservative

An election to Worcestershire County Council took place on 4 June 2009 as part of the 2009 United Kingdom local elections, alongside the 31 other County Councils, five of which are unitary, and a few other areas (Note: See the footer table or main article on these elections.). The election had been delayed from 7 May, to coincide with elections to the European Parliament. 57 councillors were elected from 53 wards, which returned either one or two county councillors each by first-past-the-post voting for a four-year term of office. The wards were unchanged from the previous election in 2005. The election saw the Conservative Party retain overall control of the council with a majority of 14 seats, up from a majority of just 2 seats.

All locally registered electors (British, Commonwealth and European Union citizens) who were aged 18 or over on Thursday 2 May 2013 were entitled to vote in the local elections. Those who were temporarily away from their ordinary address (for example, away working, on holiday, in student accommodation or in hospital) were also entitled to vote in the local elections, although those who had moved abroad and registered as overseas electors cannot vote in the local elections. It is possible to register to vote at more than one address (such as a university student who had a term-time address and lives at home during holidays) at the discretion of the local Electoral Register Office, but it remains an offence to vote more than once in the same local government election.

== County results ==
Worcestershire County Council election, 2009
| Party | Seats | Gains | Losses | Net gain/loss | Seats % | Votes % | Votes | +/− |
|---|---|---|---|---|---|---|---|---|
| Conservative | 42 | 12 | 0 | +12 | 73.7 | 42.7 | 83,273 | +2.8 |
| Liberal Democrats | 8 | 0 | 0 | 0 | 14.0 | 18.3 | 35,734 | -3.6 |
| Labour | 3 | 0 | 12 | -12 | 5.3 | 13.4 | 26,183 | -12.9 |
| Health Concern | 2 | 1 | 0 | +1 | 3.5 | 5.1 | 10,002 | +4.7 |
| Liberal | 1 | 0 | 1 | -1 | 1.8 | 1.4 | 2,707 | -0.1 |
| Wythall Residents Association | 1 | 1 | 0 | +1 | 1.8 | 0.6 | 1,224 | +0.0 |
| Green | 0 | 0 | 0 | 0 | 0.0 | 8.2 | 15,958 | +4.9 |
| UKIP | 0 | 0 | 0 | 0 | 0.0 | 4.4 | 8,478 | +4.3 |
| BNP | 0 | 0 | 0 | 0 | 0.0 | 3.4 | 5,353 | +3.4 |
| Independent | 0 | 0 | 1 | -1 | 0.0 | 2.3 | 4,383 | +0.4 |
| English Democrat | 0 | 0 | 0 | 0 | 0.0 | 0.2 | 369 | +0.2 |

== Ward results ==
=== Redditch South West (Redditch South West and Rural Borough) ===
Redditch South ward election, 2009 Redditch South
| Party | Candidate | Votes | % | ±% |
|---|---|---|---|---|
| Conservative | Barry Gandy | 2,929 | 26.1 | |
| Conservative | Peter Gretton | 2,583 | 22.9 | |
| UKIP | Johnathan Oakton | 1,515 | 13.5 | |
| Liberal Democrats | Graham Pollard | 973 | 8.6 | |
| Liberal Democrats | Adam Isherwood | 874 | 7.7 | |
| Green | Alistair Waugh | 821 | 7.2 | |
| Labour | Mark Shurmer | 787 | 6.9 | |
| Labour | John Witherspoon | 778 | 6.8 | |

=== Arrow Valley West (Redditch) ===
Arrow Valley West ward election, 2009 Arrow Valley West (Redditch)
| Party | Candidate | Votes | % | ±% |
|---|---|---|---|---|
| Conservative | Brandon Clayton | 1,677 | 19.1 | |
| Conservative | Jane Potter | 1,626 | 18.5 | |
| Labour | Andrew Fry | 1,410 | 16.0 | |
| Labour | Pattie Hill | 1,274 | 14.5 | |
| Liberal Democrats | Diane Thomas | 1,075 | 12.2 | |
| Liberal Democrats | Russle Taylor | 900 | 10.2 | |
| Green | Kevin White | 815 | 9.2 | |

=== Alvechurch (Bromsgrove) ===
Alvechurch ward election, 2009 Alvechurch
| Party | Candidate | Votes | % | ±% |
|---|---|---|---|---|
| Conservative | George Lord (Leader, Worcestershire County Council) | 1,165 | 40.9 | |
| UKIP | Peter McHugh | 626 | 22.0 | |
| Liberal Democrats | Magaret Allen | 376 | 13.2 | |
| Labour | Rory Shannon | 264 | 9.2 | |
| Green | Tim Martin | 222 | 7.8 | |
| BNP | Sylvia Kinchin | 189 | 6.6 | |

=== Pershore (Wychavon) ===
Pershore ward election, 2009 Pershore
| Party | Candidate | Votes | % | ±% |
|---|---|---|---|---|
| Liberal Democrats | Elizabeth Tucker | 2,090 | 55.7 | |
| Conservative | Ronald Davis | 990 | 26.4 | |
| English Democrat | Frederick Bishop | 369 | 9.8 | |
| Green | Dave Shaw | 298 | 7.9 | |
