= 2021 Worcestershire County Council election =

2021 UK local government election

- 6 May 2021

All 57 council division seats 29 seats needed for a majority
	First party	Second party
Party	Conservative	Liberal Democrats
Last election	40	3
Seats won	45	4
Seat change	▲5	▲1
Popular vote	91,852	18,953
Percentage	49.6%	10.2%
Swing	▲2.8%	▼1.4%
	Third party	Fourth party	Fifth party
Party	Labour	Green	Independent
Last election	10	2	1
Seats won	3	3	2
Seat change	▼7	▲1	▲1
Popular vote	36,663	19,253	13,778
Percentage	19.8%	10.4%	7.4%
Swing	▼3.1%	▲3.7%	▲4.2%
- Map showing the results of the 2021 Worcestershire County Council Elections
Council control before election
Conservative
Council control after election
Conservative

Elections to Worcestershire County Council took place on 6 May 2021 as part of the 2021 United Kingdom local elections.

== Summary ==
=== Election result ===
2021 Worcestershire County Council election
Party	Candidates	Seats	Gains	Losses	Net gain/loss	Seats %	Votes %	Votes	+/−
Conservative	57	45	10	5	▲5	79.0	49.6	91,852	+2.8
Liberal Democrats	53	4	3	2	▲1	7.0	10.2	18,953	–1.4
Labour	56	3	0	7	▼7	5.3	19.8	36,663	–3.1
Green	45	3	1	0	▲1	5.3	10.4	19,253	+3.7
Independent	19	2	2	1	▲1	3.5	7.4	13,778	+4.2
Health Concern	5	0	0	1	▼1	0.0	1.8	3,367	–0.7
Reform	7	0	0	0	Steady	0.0	0.4	677	N/A
Monster Raving Loony	3	0	0	0	Steady	0.0	0.2	313	N/A
TUSC	3	0	0	0	Steady	0.0	0.1	116	N/A
Women's Equality	1	0	0	0	Steady	0.0	<0.1	68	±0.0
SDP	1	0	0	0	Steady	0.0	<0.1	16	N/A

== Results by division ==
=== Bromsgrove ===
Alvechurch
Party	Candidate	Votes	%	±%
Conservative	Aled Luckman	1,424	44.98	
Independent	Alan Bailes	1242	39.23	
Labour	Simon Nicholls	324	10.23	
Green	Kevin White	176	5.56	
Turnout		3166		
Conservative gain from Independent		Swing		

Beacon
Party	Candidate	Votes	%	±%
Conservative	Adrian Kriss	1,465	38.41	
Labour	Peter McDonald	1346	35.29	
Independent	Kate van der Plank	679	17.80	
Green	Jill Harvey	249	6.53	
Liberal Democrats	James Clarke	75	1.97	
Turnout				
Conservative gain from Labour		Swing		

Bromsgrove Central
Party	Candidate	Votes	%	±%
Liberal Democrats	Joshua Robinson	1,333	41.91	
Conservative	Kashmir Uppal	1131	35.55	
Labour	Jane Elledge	446	14.02	
Green	John Smout	157	4.94	
Independent	David Pardoe	114	3.58	
Turnout				
Liberal Democrats gain from Conservative		Swing		

Bromsgrove East
Party	Candidate	Votes	%	±%
Conservative	Kit Taylor	1,780	53.81	
Liberal Democrats	Samuel Evans	846	25.57	
Labour	Mattie Osborne	446	13.48	
Green	Peter Measham	236	7.13	
Turnout				
Conservative hold		Swing		

Bromsgrove South
Party	Candidate	Votes	%	±%
Conservative	Kyle Daisley	1,324	51.00	
Labour	Abdul Jilani	581	22.38	
Liberal Democrats	David Nicholl	514	19.80	
Green	Peter Harvey	177	6.82	
Turnout				
Conservative gain from Labour		Swing		

Bromsgrove West
Party	Candidate	Votes	%	±%
Labour	Luke Mallett	1,703	62.45	
Conservative	Mark Boulton	734	26.92	
Liberal Democrats	Joanna McKenna	156	5.72	
Green	Jake Hughes	134	4.91	
Turnout				
Labour hold		Swing		

Clent Hills
Party	Candidate	Votes	%	±%
Conservative	Karen May	2,147	51.75	
Independent	Steven Colella	1491	35.94	
Labour	Alan Cooper	226	5.45	
Green	Jennifer Eccleston	168	4.05	
Liberal Democrats	Sara Woodhouse	74	1.78	
Reform	Stan Francis	43	1.04	
Turnout				
Conservative hold		Swing		

Woodvale
Party	Candidate	Votes	%	±%
Conservative	Shirley Webb	1,896	66.20	
Labour	Brenda Henderson	550	19.20	
Green	Julian Gray	258	9.01	
Liberal Democrats	Martin German	160	5.59	
Turnout				
Conservative hold		Swing		

Wythall
Party	Candidate	Votes	%	±%
Conservative	Adam Kent	1,976	71.75	
Independent	Stephen Peters	299	10.86	
Labour	Tony Maslen	285	10.35	
Green	Nicola Payne	131	4.76	
Liberal Democrats	Vanessa Verlinden	63	2.29	
Turnout				
Conservative hold		Swing		

=== Malvern Hills ===
Croome
Party	Candidate	Votes	%	±%
Green	Martin Allen	1,755	54.90	
Conservative	Paul Middlebrough	1270	39.72	
Labour	John Ellis	99	3.10	
Liberal Democrats	Clifford Hobbs	73	2.28	
Turnout		3197		
Green gain from Conservative		Swing		

Hallow
Party	Candidate	Votes	%	±%
Conservative	Scott Richardson Brown	1,579	45.27	
Independent	Daniel Walton	1352	38.76	
Liberal Democrats	Jed Marson	289	8.29	
Labour	Susan Dalley	268	7.68	
Turnout		3488		
Conservative hold		Swing		

Malvern Chase
Party	Candidate	Votes	%	±%
Liberal Democrats	Jack Satterthwaite	1,157	37.42	
Conservative	Lucy Hodgson	976	31.57	
Independent	John Gallagher	702	22.70	
Labour	Gregory Chance	257	8.31	
Turnout				
Liberal Democrats gain from Conservative		Swing		

Malvern Langland
Party	Candidate	Votes	%	±%
Independent	Beverley Nielsen	815	31.30	
Conservative	James O'Donnell	745	28.61	
Liberal Democrats	Paul Bennett	656	25.19	
Labour	Neil Morton	388	14.9	
Turnout		2004		
Independent gain from Conservative		Swing		

Malvern Link
Party	Candidate	Votes	%	±%
Conservative	Karen Hanks	1,019	33.02	
Independent	Peter Whatley	758	24.56	
Liberal Democrats	Dee Tomlin	662	21.45	
Labour	Sharon Taylor	415	13.45	
Independent	Michael Savage	155	5.02	
Reform	Max Windsor-Peplow	77	2.5	
Turnout		3086		
Conservative hold		Swing		

Malvern Trinity
Party	Candidate	Votes	%	±%
Green	Natalie McVey	1,451	56.11	
Conservative	Liam Thompson	730	28.23	
Labour	Simon Cronin	180	6.96	
Liberal Democrats	Richard Whitehead	135	5.22	
Reform	Rachel Clutterbuck	90	3.48	
Turnout		2586		
Green hold		Swing		

Powick
Party	Candidate	Votes	%	±%
Independent	Tom Wells	2,537	70.89	
Conservative	Melanie Baker	786	21.96	
Labour	Aidan Stitt	168	4.69	
Liberal Democrats	Miles Dudman	88	2.46	
Turnout		3579		
Independent gain from Liberal Democrats		Swing		

Tenbury
Party	Candidate	Votes	%	±%
Conservative	David Chambers	2,109	69.58	
Green	Peter Jones	435	14.35	
Labour	Christopher Burrows	325	10.72	
Liberal Democrats	David Mead	162	5.34	
Turnout		3031		
Conservative hold		Swing		

=== Redditch ===
Arrow Valley East
Party	Candidate	Votes	%	±%
Conservative	Matt Dormer	2,545	45.91	
Conservative	Jo Monk	2,348	42.35	
Labour	Joe Baker	1511	27.25	
Labour	Wanda King	1248	22.51	
Independent	Juliet Brunner	820	14.79	
Liberal Democrats	Mark Tomes	460	8.30	
Independent	Isabel Armstrong	328	5.92	
Liberal Democrats	Andy Thompson	313	5.65	
Green	Vicki Lees	285	5.14	
Green	Simon Venables	206	3.72	
Turnout		5561		
Conservative hold		Swing		
Conservative hold		Swing		

Arrow Valley West
Party	Candidate	Votes	%	±%
Conservative	Aled Evans	2,193	47.73	
Conservative	Emma Marshall	1,963	42.72	
Labour	Andrew Fry	1633	35.54	
Labour	Sharon Harvey	1309	28.49	
Green	Gabby Hemming	309	6.72	
Liberal Democrats	Diane Thomas	249	5.42	
Green	Steve Sergent	237	5.16	
Liberal Democrats	David Gee	223	4.85	
Turnout		4612		
Conservative gain from Labour		Swing		
Conservative gain from Labour		Swing		

Redditch North
Party	Candidate	Votes	%	±%
Conservative	Salman Akbar	2,625	48.73	
Conservative	Brandon Clayton	2,388	44.33	
Labour	Debbie Chance	1789	33.21	
Labour	Robin Lunn	1515	28.12	
Green	Glen Theobald	371	6.89	
Green	Alistair Waugh	328	6.09	
Liberal Democrats	Tony Pitt	260	4.83	
Liberal Democrats	Ian Webster	227	4.21	
Turnout		5421		
Conservative gain from Labour		Swing		
Conservative hold		Swing		

Redditch South
Party	Candidate	Votes	%	±%
Conservative	Mike Rouse	3,220	57.19	
Conservative	Craig Warhurst	3,042	54.03	
Labour	Phil Berry	1325	23.53	
Labour	Monica Fry	1206	21.42	
Green	Claire Davies	553	9.82	
Green	Lea Room	343	6.09	
Liberal Democrats	Pamela Gee	321	5.70	
Liberal Democrats	John Marsh	293	5.20	
Turnout		5663		
Conservative hold		Swing		
Conservative hold		Swing		

=== Worcester ===
Bedwardine
Party	Candidate	Votes	%	±%
Conservative	Alan Amos	1,429	52.38	
Labour	Sue Smith	744	27.27	
Green	Martin Jones	295	10.81	
Liberal Democrats	John Ondreasz	192	7.04	
Women's Equality	Leisa Taylor	68	2.49	
Turnout		2728		
Conservative hold		Swing		

Claines
Party	Candidate	Votes	%	±%
Liberal Democrats	Mel Alcott	1,647	45.99	
Conservative	Chris Mitchell	1,221	34.10	
Labour	Matthew Lamb	358	10.00	
Green	Jeremy Burton	311	8.68	
Reform	Paul Hickling	44	1.23	
Turnout		3581		
Liberal Democrats gain from Conservative		Swing		

Gorse Hill and Warndon
Party	Candidate	Votes	%	±%
Conservative	James Stanley	952	48.92	
Labour	Ceri Stalker	758	38.95	
Green	Louise Davies-Foley	152	7.81	
Liberal Democrats	Alison Morgan	84	4.32	
Turnout		1946		
Conservative gain from Labour		Swing		

Nunnery
Party	Candidate	Votes	%	±%
Conservative	Allah Ditta	1,105	45.83	
Labour Co-op	Pat Agar	960	39.82	
Green	Hilary Craig	244	10.12	
Liberal Democrats	Clive Fletcher	102	4.23	
Turnout		2411		
Conservative gain from Labour Co-op		Swing		

Rainbow Hill
Party	Candidate	Votes	%	±%
Labour Co-op	Lynn Denham	1,112	49.85	
Conservative	Jim Carver	722	32.19	
Green	Simon Bovey	259	11.55	
Liberal Democrats	Sue Carpenter	93	4.15	
TUSC	Calvin Fowler	57	2.54	
Turnout		2243		
Labour Co-op hold		Swing		

Riverside
Party	Candidate	Votes	%	±%
Conservative	Simon Geraghty	1,637	49.62	
Labour Co-op	Jenny Barnes	922	27.95	
Green	Jonathan Bodenham	495	15.00	
Liberal Democrats	Mark Fenton	141	4.27	
Reform	Julie Bower	70	2.12	
TUSC	Archie Harrison	34	1.03	
Turnout		3299		
Conservative hold		Swing		

St John
Party	Candidate	Votes	%	±%
Labour Co-op	Richard Udall	1,032	58.24	
Conservative	Owen Cleary	473	26.69	
Green	Heather McNeillis-Wilson	174	9.82	
Liberal Democrats	Peter Jackson	68	3.84	
TUSC	Mark Davies	25	1.41	
Turnout		1772		
Labour Co-op hold		Swing		

St Peter
Party	Candidate	Votes	%	±%
Conservative	Steve Mackay	1,889	45.59	
Green	Tom Piotrowski	1857	44.82	
Labour	Edward Kimberley	292	7.05	
Liberal Democrats	Ken Carpenter	105	2.53	
Turnout		4143		
Conservative hold		Swing		

St Stephen
Party	Candidate	Votes	%	±%
Green	Matthew Jenkins	1,853	56.74	
Labour	Joy Squires	674	20.64	
Conservative	Annabel Heath	650	19.90	
Liberal Democrats	Simon Cottingham	89	2.73	
Turnout		3266		
Green hold		Swing		

Warndon Parish
Party	Candidate	Votes	%	±%
Conservative	Andy Roberts	1,773	61.07	
Labour	David Taylor	484	16.67	
Green	Emily Bond	450	15.50	
Liberal Democrats	John Rudge	180	6.20	
SDP	Darren Rushby	16	0.55	
Turnout		2903		
Conservative hold		Swing		

=== Wychavon ===
Bowbrook
Party	Candidate	Votes	%	±%
Conservative	Marc Bayliss	1,969	58.68	
Liberal Democrats	Margaret Rowley	801	23.88	
Labour	Alex Knudsen	445	13.27	
Reform	Christopher Edmondson	140	4.17	
Turnout				
Conservative hold		Swing		

Bredon
Party	Candidate	Votes	%	±%
Conservative	Adrian Hardman	2,417	68.20	
Liberal Democrats	Charles Tucker	461	13.01	
Green	Mark Adams	418	11.79	
Labour	Sean Shannon	248	7.00	
Turnout		3544		
Conservative hold		Swing		

Broadway
Party	Candidate	Votes	%	±%
Conservative	Elizabeth Eyre	2,043	72.81	
Liberal Democrats	Diana Brown	415	14.79	
Labour	Richard Hales	261	9.30	
Monster Raving Loony	Wacky Whyte Wytch	87	3.10	
Turnout		2806		
Conservative hold		Swing		

Droitwich East
Party	Candidate	Votes	%	±%
Conservative	Bob Brookes	2,035	65.37	
Labour	Alan Humphries	378	12.14	
Green	Neil Franks	360	11.56	
Liberal Democrats	Paul Wiseman	340	10.92	
Turnout		3113		
Conservative hold		Swing		

Droitwich West
Party	Candidate	Votes	%	±%
Conservative	Richard Morris	1,386	62.46	
Labour	Anthony Kelly	622	28.03	
Liberal Democrats	Chas Murray	211	9.51	
Turnout		2219		
Conservative hold		Swing		

Evesham North West
Party	Candidate	Votes	%	±%
Conservative	Peter Griffiths	1,524	60.48	
Labour	Helen Russell	610	24.21	
Liberal Democrats	David Quayle	223	8.85	
Monster Raving Loony	Barmy Lord Brockman	163	6.47	
Turnout		2520		
Conservative hold		Swing		

Evesham South
Party	Candidate	Votes	%	±%
Conservative	Emma Stokes	1,188	44.20	
Green	Bob Rhodes	899	33.40	
Independent	Julie Haines	325	12.09	
Reform	Matt Snape	213	7.92	
Monster Raving Loony	Offa Ones Rocker Gailey	63	2.34	
Turnout		2688		
Conservative hold		Swing		

Harvington
Party	Candidate	Votes	%	±%
Conservative	Laura Gretton	2,020	64.97	
Green	Sarah Cohen	582	18.72	
Labour	Andrew Bevan	507	16.31	
Turnout		3109		
Conservative hold		Swing		

Littletons
Party	Candidate	Votes	%	±%
Conservative	Alastair Adams	2,258	69.24	
Labour	Mary Campbell	513	15.73	
Green	Edward Cohen	345	10.58	
Liberal Democrats	John Littlechild	145	4.45	
Turnout		3261		
Conservative hold		Swing		

Ombersley
Party	Candidate	Votes	%	±%
Conservative	Tony Miller	2,114	72.03	
Labour	Val Humphries	322	10.97	
Green	Sue Howarth	297	10.12	
Liberal Democrats	Sebastian Parsons	202	6.88	
Turnout		2935		
Conservative hold		Swing		

Pershore
Party	Candidate	Votes	%	±%
Liberal Democrats	Dan Boatright	2,073	56.19	
Conservative	Michael Hodges	1289	34.94	
Labour	Harrison Rone-Clarke	167	4.53	
Independent	Tim Haines	160	4.34	
Turnout		3689		
Liberal Democrats hold		Swing		

Upton Snodsbury
Party	Candidate	Votes	%	±%
Conservative	Linda Robinson	2,042	68.23	
Labour	Catherine Neville	321	10.73	
Liberal Democrats	Liz Turier	320	10.69	
Green	Darren Corbett	310	10.36	
Turnout		2993		
Conservative hold		Swing		

=== Wyre Forest ===
Bewdley
Party	Candidate	Votes	%	±%
Conservative	Dan Morehead	1,365	49.40	▲3.38
Labour	Rod Stanczyszyn	540	19.54	▲2.33
Independent	Calne Edginton-White	441	15.96	▼0.75
Green	Janice Bell	344	12.45	▲8.64
Liberal Democrats	Rachel Akathiotis	73	2.64	▼2.61
Majority		825	29.86	
Turnout		2,763		
Conservative hold		Swing		

Chaddesley
Party	Candidate	Votes	%	±%
Conservative	Marcus Hart	1,528	54.45	▲8.89
Independent	Helen Dyke	939	33.46	▼2.48
Labour	Chris Hand	240	8.55	▲0.96
Independent	Gary James	99	3.53	N/A
Majority		589	20.99	
Turnout		2,806		
Conservative hold		Swing		

Cookley, Wolverley and Wribbenhall
Party	Candidate	Votes	%	±%
Conservative	Ian Hardiman	1,654	55.63	▲17.31
Labour	David Jones	580	19.51	▲2.20
Health Concern	John Beeson	436	14.67	▲2.16
Green	Kate Spohrer	265	8.91	▲4.36
Liberal Democrats	Marcin Gorecki	38	1.28	▼1.50
Majority		1,074	35.88	
Turnout		2,993		
Conservative hold		Swing		

St Barnabas
Party	Candidate	Votes	%	±%
Conservative	David Ross	1,114	45.90	▼7.89
Labour	Nigel Knowles	586	24.15	▼10.23
Health Concern	Susie Griffiths	493	20.31	N/A
Green	Phil Oliver	158	6.51	▲4.40
Liberal Democrats	Oliver Walker	76	3.13	▼0.28
Majority		528	21.76	▼12.23
Turnout		2,427		
Conservative hold		Swing		

St Chads
Party	Candidate	Votes	%	±%
Conservative	Bill Hopkins	910	40.30	▲10.65
Liberal Democrats	Fran Oborski	832	36.85	▼4.74
Labour	Luke Hilton	319	14.13	▼1.63
Green	Brett Caulfield	197	8.72	▲4.99
Majority		78	3.45	
Turnout		2,258		
Conservative gain from Liberal Democrats		Swing		

St Georges and St Oswalds
Party	Candidate	Votes	%	±%
Conservative	Tony Muir	654	30.73	▲7.95
Independent	Mary Rayner	522	24.53	▼10.35
Liberal Democrats	Shazu Miah	446	20.96	▲3.55
Labour	Marie Holmes	357	16.78	▲0.74
Green	Mattie Viner	149	7.00	▲3.32
Majority		132	6.20	
Turnout		2,128		

St Johns
Party	Candidate	Votes	%	±%
Conservative	Tracey Onslow	1,330	56.67	▲9.94
Labour	Leigh Whitehouse	558	23.78	▲6.50
Health Concern	Susan Meekings	194	8.27	▼8.82
Green	John Davis	156	6.65	▲3.05
Liberal Democrats	Adrian Beavis	109	4.64	▼3.88
Majority		772	32.89	
Turnout		2,347		

St Marys
Party	Candidate	Votes	%	±%
Conservative	Nathan Desmond	1,277	53.12	▲10.02
Labour	Gareth Webster	546	22.71	▲0.50
Liberal Democrats	Clare Cassidy	325	13.52	▲3.57
Green	Dave Finch	256	10.65	▲7.30
Majority				
Turnout		2423		

Stourport on Severn
Party	Candidate	Votes	%	±%
Conservative	Chris Rogers	2,305	47.41	▲7.48
Conservative	Paul Harrison	2,165	44.53	▲8.83
Health Concern	Clare Barnett	1,152	23.69	▲1.51
Health Concern	John Thomas	1,092	22.46	▼0.02
Labour	Jackie Griffiths	911	18.74	▼4.81
Labour	Nick Savage	753	15.49	▼6.66
Green	Luke Clasper	468	9.63	▲7.36
Liberal Democrats	Ingrid Schmeising-Barnes	193	3.97	▼0.20
Liberal Democrats	Christopher Pratt	180	3.70	▲0.14
Majority				
Turnout		4870		

== Changes between 2021 and 2025 ==
- In January 2024, Bill Hopkins left the Conservative group and subsequently joined Reform UK.
- By July 2024, Kyle Daisley and Mike Rouse had left the Conservative group to sit as independents.
- In August 2024, independent councillor Beverley Nielsen joined Labour.
- In November 2024, Tony Muir left the Conservative group to sit as an independent.
- In January 2025, Alan Amos left the Conservatives to sit as an independent.
- In March 2025, Jo Monk left the Conservatives and joined Reform UK.

=== By-elections ===
==== Arrow Valley West ====
The Arrow Valley West by-election was triggered by the resignation of Conservative councillor Aled Evans.

Arrow Valley West by-election, 1 September 2022
Party	Candidate	Votes	%	±%
Labour	Andrew Fry	1,342	53.7	+18.1
Conservative	Gemma Louise Monaco	893	35.7	−12.0
Green	Glen Christopher Theobald	146	5.8	−0.9
Liberal Democrats	Mark Adrian Wayne Tomes	120	4.8	−0.6
Majority		449	18.0	
Turnout		2501	15.9	−13.7
Registered electors		15,819		
Labour gain from Conservative		Swing	15.1	

==== Malvern Chase ====
The Malvern Chase by-election was triggered by the resignation of Liberal Democrat councillor Jack Satterthwaite.

Malvern Chase by-election, 4 May 2023
Party	Candidate	Votes	%	±%
Green	Malcolm Gordon Victory	740	25.4	N/A
Conservative	David Edgar Lawrence Watkins	737	25.3	−6.3
Liberal Democrats	Pete Benkwitz	684	23.5	−13.9
Labour	Martin Henry Willis	388	13.3	+5.0
MH Independents	Sarah Jane Rouse	364	12.5	N/A
Majority		3	0.1	
Turnout		2913	40.3	+10.2
Registered electors		7,355		
Green gain from Liberal Democrats		Swing		

==== Warndon Parish ====
The Warndon Parish by-election was triggered by the death of Conservative councillor Andy Roberts.

Warndon Parish by-election, 19 October 2023
Party	Candidate	Votes	%	±%
Green	Andrew Cross	1,139	44.1	+28.6
Conservative	Lucy Hodgson	623	24.1	−37.0
Liberal Democrats	Sarah Murray	579	22.4	+16.2
Labour	Robyn Norfolk	239	9.3	−7.4
Majority		516	20.0	
Turnout		2580	30.1	
Registered electors		8,578		
Green gain from Conservative		Swing	32.8	

==== Evesham North West ====
The Evesham North West by-election was triggered by the death of Conservative councillor Peter Griffiths.

Evesham North West by-election, 2 May 2024
Party	Candidate	Votes	%	±%
Conservative	Mark Sidney Goodge	655	33.0	−27.5
Labour	David Martin Tasker	453	22.8	−1.4
Liberal Democrats	Oliver Walker	245	12.3	+3.5
Independent	John Raymond Campbell-Muir	237	11.9	N/A
Green	Stephen Squires	205	10.3	N/A
Independent	Peter Scurfield	191	9.6	N/A
Majority		202	10.2	
Turnout		1986	21.8	
Registered electors		9,169		
Conservative hold		Swing		
