= Alan Amos =

British politician

Member of Parliament for Hexham
- In office 11 June 1987 – 16 March 1992
- Preceded by: Geoffrey Rippon
- Succeeded by: Peter Atkinson

Personal details
- Born: 10 November 1952 (age 73)
- Party: Reform UK (since 2025)
- Other political affiliations: Labour (1994–2015); Conservative (1978–94; 2015–25)
- Education: St John's College, Oxford
- Occupation: Politician

Alan Thomas Amos (born 10 November 1952) is a British politician who sat as Conservative Member of Parliament for Hexham from 1987 to 1992. He has been elected as a councillor for the Conservatives, the Labour Party and Reform UK.

After serving as a Labour Party councillor on both Tower Hamlets and Worcester, he defected back to the Conservatives and was elected as a Conservative member on both Worcester City Council and Worcestershire County Council. He later resigned from the Conservatives and was re-elected as a member of Reform UK in the 2025 Worcestershire County Council election.

== Early life ==
He attended the independent St Albans School. He studied PPE at St John's College, Oxford. From the Institute of Education, he gained a PGCE in 1976.

From 1976 to 1984, he was an Economics teacher, and a sixth-form form-teacher, at Dame Alice Owen's School in Hertfordshire. From 1986 to 1987, he was Assistant Principal of Davies's College of Further Education on Old Gloucester Street, Queen Square, London.

From 1978 to 1987 he was a Conservative Party councillor on Enfield Borough Council.

At the 1983 general election, he stood unsuccessfully in Walthamstow as a Conservative candidate.

== Parliamentary career ==
Amos was elected as the Conservative Member of Parliament for Hexham in the 1987 general election.

In Parliament, Amos was known for his right wing views, e.g., he believed rapists and muggers should be flogged. He was opposed to tobacco advertising.

Shortly before the 1992 general election, Amos was arrested, along with another man, at a well-known homosexual pickup spot on Hampstead Heath. Amos was not charged but accepted a police caution for indecency, and stood down as MP for Hexham.

== Conversion to Labour ==
After failing to be readopted as a Conservative councillor in the London Borough of Enfield, where he had previously been deputy leader of the council, he joined the Labour Party in 1994, giving a self-exculpatory interview to The Spectator magazine. In the 2001 general election he fought the Hitchin and Harpenden constituency for Labour, coming second to the Conservative Peter Lilley.

He was elected for Labour to the Millwall ward of the London Borough of Tower Hamlets in 2002, serving as councillor for four years before losing the seat to the Conservatives in the 2006 election. He returned to local politics in May 2008 with his election as a Labour councillor for the Warndon ward of Worcester City Council. In 2013 he was also elected as a Labour member of Worcestershire County Council.

== Independent councillor ==
Following the May 2014 local government elections, the composition of Worcester City Council was 17 Conservative, 16 Labour, 1 Liberal Democrat and 1 Green, making both major groups reliant on minority support to gain control of the council. Before the Council AGM, Alan Amos announced he was leaving the Labour group to sit as an Independent councillor, allegedly from dissatisfaction that he had not been selected by Labour as a future mayor of Worcester. At the council's AGM on 3 June 2014, Amos accepted the Conservative nomination as mayor of Worcester, and, as mayor, voted for the Council administration to change from Labour to Conservative.

== Move back to the Conservatives ==
Following the 2015 Worcester City Council election and hours before his tenure as Mayor of Worcester was to end, Amos announced he was rejoining the Conservative party. In the 2024 Worcester City Council election he was re-elected and was the sole Conservative on the city council. Then, in 2025, he sat as an Independent on the city council and on Worcestershire County Council.

== Move to Reform ==
On 3 April 2025 Amos announced that, after less than four months as an independent councillor, he was joining Reform UK, saying:

"The approach from Reform was unexpected but I have found that we have much in common on the need for Britain to change direction and make a decisive break from the old, tired and discredited parties."

In the 2025 Worcestershire County Council election, he was re-elected under this new banner with 1,182 votes (41.47% of those cast). In doing so, he beat fellow former Conservative MP and Cabinet Minister Stephen Dorrell who was standing for the Liberal Democrats.

He stood for the leadership of the Reform UK group on the County Council in May but withdrew his candidacy after "being unable to secure enough support". The contest came to down to two former Conservatives, Bill Hopkins and Joanne Monk. The selection was won by Monk.

From when he left the Conservatives in January 2025 to 2 July Amos had only attended 38% of the meetings he was expected to. In the six months before that he only attended 40% of meetings he was expected to attend.

Following the election and the commencement of the Council, Amos was selected to join the cabinet of the new administration on 22 May, as Cabinet Member with Responsibility for Business and Training.

In April 2026, Amos was elected as the Reform group leader on Worcestershire County Council but in May, Reform lost the leadership of the council to an alliance of Greens, Liberal Democrats, Conservatives and independents.

== Controversies ==
In 2016 Amos claimed women make up rape. He is known for his right-wing views on immigration, when in 2019, 23 child asylum seekers were resettled in Worcestershire.

He has also called cyclists "morons and dangerous" as well as describing courier riders as "Deliveroo Idiots".

In 2021, Amos suggested Worcester's "woke" theatres could lose funding after cancelling an appearance by comedian Andrew Lawrence, following Lawrence's offensive social media posts about the England football team's black players during Euro 2020.

In April 2024 Amos asked for funding allocated to housing Ukrainian refugees to be used to clean up dog mess and litter instead, despite knowing it was ring-fenced funding.

In 2024 Amos, as a Conservative councillor, said it was "discriminatory" for a Green Mayor of Worcester City Council to serve plant-based food at civic functions.

In September 2025 during a Worcestershire County Council Cabinet meeting he claimed long-term sickness is just an "excuse for job evasion". He continued to say "the Government needs to take an axe to these welfare payments [and] must stop this endless and absurd medicalisation of behaviours and attitudes, for which there are no medical solutions because there are no medical conditions to treat." He also claimed that whilst 34% of inactivity was related to long term sickness - and that the other 66% of inactive residents "are there for a variety of credible reasons", implying that mental health is not a credible condition for inactivity.

Parliament of the United Kingdom
Preceded by Geoffrey Rippon	Member of Parliament for Hexham; 1987–1992	Succeeded by Peter Atkinson
