= Worcester City Council elections =

Local government elections in Worcestershire, England

Worcester City Council elections are held three years out of every four, with a third of the council elected each time. Worcester City Council is the local authority for the non-metropolitan district of Worcester in Worcestershire, England. Since the last boundary changes in 2004, 35 councillors have been elected from 15 wards.

== Council elections ==
- 1973 Worcester City Council election
- 1975 Worcester City Council election
- 1976 Worcester City Council election
- 1978 Worcester City Council election
- 1979 Worcester City Council election (New ward boundaries)
- 1980 Worcester City Council election
- 1982 Worcester City Council election
- 1983 Worcester City Council election
- 1984 Worcester City Council election
- 1986 Worcester City Council election
- 1987 Worcester City Council election (City boundary changes took place but the number of seats remained the same)
- 1988 Worcester City Council election
- 1990 Worcester City Council election
- 1991 Worcester City Council election
- 1992 Worcester City Council election
- 1994 Worcester City Council election
- 1995 Worcester City Council election
- 1996 Worcester City Council election
- 1998 Worcester City Council election
- 1999 Worcester City Council election
- 2000 Worcester City Council election
- 2002 Worcester City Council election
- 2003 Worcester City Council election
- 2004 Worcester City Council election (New ward boundaries)
- 2006 Worcester City Council election
- 2007 Worcester City Council election
- 2008 Worcester City Council election
- 2010 Worcester City Council election
- 2011 Worcester City Council election
- 2012 Worcester City Council election
- 2014 Worcester City Council election
- 2015 Worcester City Council election
- 2016 Worcester City Council election
- 2018 Worcester City Council election
- 2019 Worcester City Council election
- 2021 Worcester City Council election
- 2022 Worcester City Council election
- 2023 Worcester City Council election
- 2024 Worcester City Council election (New ward boundaries and change to all-out elections)

== District result maps ==
2004 results map

2006 results map

2007 results map

2008 results map

2010 results map

2011 results map

2012 results map

2014 results map

2015 results map

2016 results map

2018 results map

2019 results map

2021 results map

2022 results map

2023 results map

2024 results map

== By-election results ==
=== 1994-1998 ===
Holy Trinity By-Election 26 September 1996
Party	Candidate	Votes	%	±%
Labour		633	70.0	
Liberal Democrats		171	18.9	
Conservative		100	11.0	
Majority		462	51.1	
Turnout		904	21.1	
Labour hold		Swing		

=== 2006-2010 ===
St Clement By-Election 20 September 2007
Party	Candidate	Votes	%	±%
Labour	Jennifer Barnes	604	42.5	+19.5
Conservative	Lisa Ventura-Whiting	478	33.6	−15.8
BNP	Peter Beechey	166	11.7	−4.1
UKIP	John Butterfield	122	8.6	+8.6
Green	Olaf Twiehaus	52	3.7	−8.1
Majority		126	8.9	
Turnout		1,422	31.4	
Labour gain from Conservative		Swing		

=== 2014-2018 ===
Bedwardine By-Election 10 May 2017
Party	Candidate	Votes	%	±%
Conservative	Bill Amos	1,457	56.3	+13.2
Labour	Jennifer Barnes	816	31.6	+5.6
Green	Daniel Daye	189	7.3	+1.4
UKIP	Paul Hickling	124	4.8	−9.6
Majority		641	24.8	
Turnout		2,586		
Conservative hold		Swing		

=== 2018-2022 ===
Claines By-Election 8 August 2019
Party	Candidate	Votes	%	±%
Liberal Democrats	Mel Allcott	1,307	47.6	+8.2
Conservative	Jules Benham	1,252	45.6	+3.0
Green	Stephen Dent	125	4.6	−3.7
Labour	Saiful Islam	60	2.2	−2.7
Majority		55	2.0	
Turnout		2,744		
Liberal Democrats gain from Conservative		Swing		

=== 2022-2024 ===
Nunnery By-Election 20 July 2023
Party	Candidate	Votes	%	±%
Labour	Elaine Willmore	1,048	59.7	+11.9
Conservative	Allah Ditta	518	29.5	−2.8
Liberal Democrats	Scott Butler	102	5.8	−0.5
Independent	David Carney	88	5.0	−0.1
Majority		530	30.2	
Turnout		1,756		
Labour hold		Swing		

Warndon Parish South By-Election 19 October 2023
Party	Candidate	Votes	%	±%
Green	Katie Collier	733	53.7	−11.7
Conservative	Janet Lippett	340	24.9	+2.5
Labour	Sunil Desayrah	171	12.5	+2.6
Liberal Democrats	Paul Jagger	92	6.7	+4.4
Reform	Paul Hickling	29	2.1	+2.1
Majority		393	28.8	
Turnout		1,365		
Green gain from Conservative		Swing		
