= 2024 Worcester City Council election =

Local election in Worcester, England

← 2023	2 May 2024	2028 →

All 35 seats to Worcester City Council 18 seats needed for a majority

	First party	Second party
Leader	Lynn Denham	Marjory Bisset
Party	Labour	Green
Last election	13 seats, 28.0%	10 seats, 28.4%
Seats before	13	11
Seats won	17	12
Seat change	▲4	▲1
Popular vote	16,203	18,092
Percentage	29.5%	32.9%
Swing	▲1.5%	▲4.5%
	Third party	Fourth party
Party	Liberal Democrats	Conservative
Last election	4 seats, 16.3%	8 seats, 25.4%
Seats before	4	7
Seats won	5	1
Seat change	▲1	▼6
Popular vote	7,894	11,082
Percentage	14.3%	20.1%
Swing	▼2.0%	▼5.3%
- Winner of each seat at the 2024 Worcester City Council election
Joint leaders before election
Lynn Denham (Labour)
Marjory Bisset (Green)
No overall control
Leader after election
Lynn Denham
Labour
No overall control

The 2024 Worcester City Council election was held on Thursday 2 May 2024, alongside the other local elections in the United Kingdom being held on the same day. All 35 members of Worcester City Council in Worcestershire were elected following boundary changes. The council remained under no overall control.

== Background ==
Worcester has been controlled by both the Conservatives and Labour for long periods. From 1980 to 1999, Labour held a majority on the council. The Conservatives then held a majority from 2003 to 2008 after a period of no overall control, and again from 2011 to 2012.

The Conservatives regained control in 2015, but the council reverted to no overall control a year later; 2021 to 2022 was also a period of Conservative majority. In the previous election, the Green Party gained 5 seats with 28.4% of the vote, Labour gained 1 with 28.0%, the Liberal Democrats gained 2 with 16.3%, and the Conservatives lost all the seats they were defending with 25.4%. Following the 2023 election, Labour and the Green Party nominated joint leaders of the council, as required by the constitution. The Green leader, Marjory Bisset, did not stand for re-election in 2024.

== Boundary changes ==
Worcester formerly elected its councillors in thirds, on a 4-year cycle. The 2024 election saw both a review of ward boundaries and a change to elections being held for all councillors every four years instead. All councillors were therefore elected to the new wards.

Old wards	No. of seats	New wards	No. of seats
Arboretum	2	Arboretum	2
Battenhall	2	Battenhall	2
Bedwardine	3	Cathedral	2
Cathedral	3	Claines	3
Claines	3	Dines Green and Grove Farm	2
Gorse Hill	2	Fort Royal	2
Nunnery	3	Leopard Hill	2
Rainbow Hill	2	Lower Wick and Pitmaston	2
St Clement	2	Nunnery	3
St John	3	Rainbow Hill	2
St Peter's Parish	2	St Clement	2
St Stephen	2	St John's	2
Warndon	2	St Nicholas	2
Warndon Parish North	2	St Peter's Parish	2
Warndon Parish South	2	St Stephen	2
		Warndon and Elbury Park	3

== Previous council composition ==
After 2023 election		Before 2024 election		After 2024 election	
Party	Seats	Party	Seats	Party	Seats
Labour	13	Labour	13	Labour	17
Green	10	Green	11	Green	12
Conservative	8	Conservative	7	Conservative	1
Liberal Democrats	4	Liberal Democrats	4	Liberal Democrats	5

Changes 2023–2024:

- May 2023: Simon Cronin (Labour) dies; by-election held July 2023
- July 2023: Elaine Willmore (Labour) holds by-election
- August 2023: Andy Roberts (Conservative) dies; by-election held October 2023
- October 2023: Katie Collier (Green Party) gains by-election from Conservatives

== Councillors standing down ==
Councillor	Ward	First elected	Party	Date announced
Simon Geraghty	St Clement	2000	Conservative	13 April 2024
Marjory Bisset			Green	

== Election result ==
2024 Worcester City Council election
Party	Candidates	Seats	Gains	Losses	Net gain/loss	Seats %	Votes %	Votes	+/−
Labour	35	17	4	0	▲4	48.6	29.5	16,203	+1.5
Green	35	12	1	0	▲1	34.3	32.9	18,092	+4.5
Liberal Democrats	23	5	1	0	▲1	14.3	14.3	7,894	-2.0
Conservative	35	1	0	6	▼6	2.9	20.1	11,082	-5.3
Independent	7	0	0	0	Steady	0	2.3	1,288	+1.8
Reform UK	2	0	0	0	Steady	0	0.5	294	+0.3
TUSC	5	0	0	0	Steady	0	0.4	206	-0.1
UKIP	1	0	0	0	Steady	0	0.1	68	+0.1

Following the election, Labour formed a minority administration. Their leader Lynn Denham, who had been one of two joint leaders before the election, was appointed sole leader of the council at the subsequent annual council meeting on 14 May 2024.

== Ward results ==
The Statement of Persons Nominated, which details the candidates standing in each ward, was released by Worcester Council following the close of nominations on 8 April 2024. Sitting councillors standing for re-election are marked with an asterisk (*).

=== Arboretum ===
Arboretum (2 seats)
Party	Candidate	Votes	%	±%
Green	Hannah Cooper*	1,183	67.2	
Green	Karen Lewing*	1,090	61.9	
Labour	Andrew Tull	314	17.8	
Labour	Nazrul Haque	261	14.8	
Conservative	Zoe Coldicott	151	8.6	
Conservative	Angela Stanley	120	6.8	
Liberal Democrats	Jon Taylor	106	6.0	
Liberal Democrats	Alison Morgan	94	5.3	
TUSC	Calvin Fowler	33	1.9	
Turnout		1,761	36.70	
Registered electors		4,798		
Green hold				
Green hold				

=== Battenhall ===
Battenhall (2 seats)
Party	Candidate	Votes	%	±%
Green	Louis Stephen*	1,367	71.6	
Green	Paul Sobczyk	1,213	63.5	
Labour	Graham Taylor	322	16.9	
Labour	Ian Benfield	306	16.0	
Conservative	Parveen Akhtar	300	15.7	
Conservative	Naseeb Hussain	253	13.2	
Liberal Democrats	Pyers Symon	59	3.1	
Turnout		2,022	43.1	
Registered electors		4,690		
Green hold				
Green hold				

=== Cathedral ===
Cathedral (2 seats)
Party	Candidate	Votes	%	±%
Labour	Lynn Denham*	644	45.4	
Labour	Adam Scott	541	38.1	
Green	Jon Bodenham	525	37.0	
Green	Leisa Taylor	464	32.7	
Conservative	Adele Rimell	225	15.9	
Conservative	Chris Rimell	216	15.2	
Independent	Francis Lankester	111	7.8	
Liberal Democrats	Andrew Smith	43	3.0	
Liberal Democrats	Stuart Wild	37	2.6	
TUSC	Archie Harrison	33	2.3	
Turnout		1,467	33.2	
Registered electors		4,419		
Labour hold				
Labour hold				

=== Claines ===
Claines (3 seats)
Party	Candidate	Votes	%	±%
Liberal Democrats	Mel Allcott*	1,798	68.2	−1.9
Liberal Democrats	Jessie Jagger*	1,401	53.2	−10.7
Liberal Democrats	Karen Lawrence*	1,333	50.6	+9.1
Conservative	Chris Thorp	473	18.0	
Conservative	Trish Nosal	373	14.2	
Conservative	Tom Wisniewski	360	13.7	
Labour	Joy Squires	333	12.6	
Labour	Louis Allaway	309	11.7	
Green	Mandy Neill	289	11.3	
Labour	Tom Henri	267	10.1	
Green	Claire Nichols	236	9.0	
Green	Simon Bovey	221	8.4	
Turnout		2,635	40.5	
Registered electors		6,500		
Liberal Democrats hold				
Liberal Democrats hold				
Liberal Democrats hold				

=== Dines Green & Grove Farm ===
Dines Green & Grove Farm (2 seats)
Party	Candidate	Votes	%	±%
Labour	Matt Lamb*	609	57.6	
Labour	Robyn Norfolk*	478	45.2	
Conservative	Margarete Cawte	211	19.9	
Conservative	Mike Wilson	206	19.5	
Green	Katherine Pingree	153	14.5	
Green	Nicola Silverster	121	11.4	
Liberal Democrats	Andrew Holmes	71	6.7	
UKIP	Martin Potter	68	6.4	
TUSC	Mark Davies	38	3.6	
Turnout		1,058	23.32	
Registered electors		4,537		
Labour win (new seat)				
Labour win (new seat)				

=== Fort Royal ===
Fort Royal (2 seats)
Party	Candidate	Votes	%	±%
Labour	Jaabba Riaz*	655	53.7	
Labour	Atif Sadiq*	504	41.3	
Green	Helen McCarthy	274	22.4	
Independent	Naheem Zafar	252	20.6	
Independent	Resnu Meah	236	19.3	
Green	Justin Kirby	179	14.7	
Conservative	Antonio Martins	130	10.7	
Conservative	Maria Martins	128	10.5	
Liberal Democrats	Andrew Lee	83	6.8	
Turnout		1,275	35.4	
Registered electors		3,607		
Labour win (new seat)				
Labour win (new seat)				

=== Leopard Hill ===
Leopard Hill (2 seats)
Party	Candidate	Votes	%	±%
Green	Andrew Cross*	1,029	65.8	
Green	Katie Collier*	906	57.9	
Conservative	Jithin Bittu	364	23.3	
Conservative	Tony Lippett	346	22.1	
Labour	Jamsheyd Ali	199	12.7	
Labour	Sunil Desayrah	176	11.2	
Liberal Democrats	Paul Jagger	64	4.1	
Liberal Democrats	Bart Ricketts	46	2.9	
Turnout			35.6	
Green win (new seat)				
Green win (new seat)				

=== Lower Wick & Pitmaston ===
Lower Wick & Pitmaston (2 seats)
Party	Candidate	Votes	%	±%
Conservative	Alan Amos*	817	49.4	
Labour	Sue Smith*	752	45.5	
Labour	Aaron Daniels	653	39.5	
Conservative	Lucy Hodgson	569	34.4	
Green	Stephen Brohan	194	11.7	
Green	Stephen Alaric	170	10.3	
Liberal Democrats	John Ondreasz	129	7.8	
TUSC	Eloise Davies	23	1.4	
Turnout		1,813	39.89	
Registered electors		4,545		
Conservative win (new seat)				
Labour win (new seat)				

=== Nunnery ===
Nunnery (3 seats)
Party	Candidate	Votes	%	±%
Labour	Pat Agar*	994	51.1	
Labour	Elaine Willmore*	963	49.6	
Labour	Bash Ali*	807	41.5	
Conservative	Allah Ditta	472	24.3	
Conservative	Leon Babu	442	22.7	
Conservative	Lucy Owen	417	21.5	
Green	Barbara Mitra	340	17.5	
Green	Alice Ponder	302	15.5	
Independent	Nadeem Ahmed	260	13.4	
Reform UK	David Carney	203	10.4	
Liberal Democrats	Scott Butler	184	9.5	
Green	Jacek Zmarzlik	157	8.1	
Independent	Asfand Ali	146	7.5	
Independent	Mikaeel Zafar	143	7.4	
Turnout			31.6	
Labour hold				
Labour hold				
Labour hold				

=== Rainbow Hill ===
Rainbow Hill (2 seats)
Party	Candidate	Votes	%	±%
Labour	Adrian Gregson*	550	47.1	
Labour	Zoe Cookson*	525	45.0	
Green	Nick Weeks	488	41.8	
Green	Josh Trimmer	464	39.8	
Conservative	Keith Burton	161	13.8	
Conservative	Mike Rouse	96	8.2	
Liberal Democrats	Susan Carpenter	50	4.3	
Turnout		1,244	26.4	
Registered electors		4,709		
Labour hold				
Labour hold				

=== St. Clement ===
St. Clement (2 seats)
Party	Candidate	Votes	%	±%
Green	Tor Pingree*	788	52.4	
Green	Alex Kinnersley	598	39.8	
Conservative	Bertie Ballinger	533	35.5	
Conservative	Seb James	482	32.1	
Labour	Ian Craigan	263	17.5	
Labour	Jacqui Wilde	179	11.9	
Reform UK	Max Windsor-Peplow	94	6.3	
Liberal Democrats	Steve Mather	59	4.6	
Turnout			37.2	
Green hold				
Green gain from Conservative				

=== St. John's ===
St. John's (2 seats)
Party	Candidate	Votes	%	±%
Labour	Richard Udall*	864	68.7	
Labour	Jenny Barnes	630	50.1	
Green	Rob Ottolangui	355	28.2	
Green	Annie Swift	322	25.6	
Conservative	Susan Burge	164	13.0	
Conservative	Alexander Snell	124	9.9	
Liberal Democrats	Peter Jackson	55	4.4	
Turnout		1,401	32.8	
Registered electors		4,277		
Labour hold				
Labour hold				

=== St. Nicholas ===
St. Nicholas (2 seats)
Party	Candidate	Votes	%	±%
Liberal Democrats	Sarah Murray*	796	52.0	
Liberal Democrats	John Rudge	569	37.2	
Conservative	Stephen Hodgson*	415	27.1	
Green	Martyn Hencher	385	25.1	
Conservative	Janet Lippett	298	19.5	
Green	Clare Wratten	295	19.3	
Labour	Mike Stafford	172	11.2	
Labour	Chris Taylor	132	8.6	
Turnout		1,595	39.3	
Registered electors		4,059		
Liberal Democrats win (new seat)				
Liberal Democrats win (new seat)				

=== St. Peter's ===
St. Peter's (2 seats)
Party	Candidate	Votes	%	±%
Green	Steve Cockeram*	832	47.7	
Green	Elena Round*	724	41.5	
Liberal Democrats	John Renshaw	537	30.8	
Conservative	James Woolgar	428	24.5	
Conservative	Steve Mackay	428	24.5	
Liberal Democrats	Ken Carpenter	216	12.4	
Labour	Jenny Benfield	181	10.4	
Labour	Stephen Tallett	142	8.1	
Turnout			36.2	
Green hold				
Green hold				

=== St. Stephen ===
St. Stephen (2 seats)
Party	Candidate	Votes	%	±%
Green	Alex Mace	995	64.2	
Green	Neil Laurenson*	981	63.3	
Conservative	Jason Wild	256	16.5	
Labour	Ruth Coates	224	14.4	
Conservative	Angelika Wisniewska	202	13.0	
Labour	Mark Willmore	138	8.9	
Liberal Democrats	Andrew Melville	53	3.4	
Turnout		1,549	38.1	
Registered electors		4,065		
Green hold				
Green hold				

=== Warndon & Elbury Park ===
Warndon & Elbury Park (3 seats)
Party	Candidate	Votes	%	±%
Labour	Jill Desayrah*	868	58.1	
Labour	Ed Kimberley	788	52.7	
Labour	Naz Hussain	708	47.4	
Conservative	James Stanley*	389	26.0	
Conservative	Owen Cleary*	388	26.0	
Conservative	Shazad Ditta	325	21.7	
Green	Sue Braithwaite	288	19.3	
Green	Sarah Dukes	235	15.7	
Green	Phil Gilfillan	165	11.0	
Independent	Mohammed Awais	140	9.4	
Liberal Democrats	Simon Cottingham	111	7.4	
TUSC	Jason Ford	80	5.4	
Turnout			22.8	
Labour win (new seat)				
Labour win (new seat)				
Labour win (new seat)				
