= 2010 Worcester City Council election =

2010 English local government election

Map of the 2010 Worcester City Council election

The 2010 Worcester City Council election took place on 6 May 2010 to elect a third of the members of Worcester City Council, the council of Worcester in England. This was on the same day as the other local elections across England as well as the 2010 United Kingdom general election. The previous council election took place in 2007 and the following election was held in 2011. In the election, the council stayed under no overall control with the Conservatives as the largest party. The Green Party hoped to win their first seat on the council but were unsuccessful.

== Results ==
Party	Previous	Seats +/-	2010
Conservative	17	Steady	17
Labour	13	Steady	13
Liberal Democrats	3	Steady	3
Other	2	Steady	2

== See also ==
- Worcester City Council elections
