= 2019 Worcester City Council election =

2019 UK local government election

← 2018	2 May 2019	2021 →

11 seats 18 seats needed for a majority

	First party	Second party
Party	Conservative	Labour
Last election	17 seats, 41.9%	15 seats, 33.8%
Seats before	16	15
Seats won	7	3
Seats after	15	15
Seat change	▼1	Steady
Popular vote	7,753	5,479
Percentage	36.9%	26.1%
	Third party	Fourth party
Party	Green	Liberal Democrats
Last election	3 seats, 12.1%	0 seats, 7.6%
Seats before	3	1
Seats won	1	0
Seats after	4	1
Seat change	▲1	Steady
Popular vote	3,947	1,949
Percentage	18.8%	9.3%
- Winner of each seat at the 2019 Worcester City Council election

The 2019 Worcester City Council election took place on 2 May 2019 to elect councillors to the Worcester City Council in England.

== Results summary ==
2019 Worcester City Council election
Party	This election			Full council			This election		
Party	Seats	Net	Seats %	Other	Total	Total %	Votes	Votes %	+/−
Conservative	7	▼1	63.6	8	15	42.9	7,753	36.9	-5.0
Labour	3	Steady	27.3	12	15	42.9	5,479	26.1	-7.7
Green	1	▲1	9.1	3	4	11.4	3,947	18.8	+6.7
Liberal Democrats	0	Steady	0.0	1	1	2.9	1,949	9.3	+1.7
UKIP	0	Steady	0.0	0	0	0.0	1,703	8.1	+4.5
Women's Equality	0	Steady	0.0	0	0	0.0	70	0.3	-0.4
Socialist Alternative	0	Steady	0.0	0	0	0.0	45	0.2	New
Democrats and Veterans	0	Steady	0.0	0	0	0.0	34	0.2	New
British Resistance	0	Steady	0.0	0	0	0.0	17	0.1	±0.0

== Ward results ==
=== Arboretum ===
Arboretum
Party	Candidate	Votes	%	±%
Labour	Jenny Barnes	667	38.4	−19.3
Green	Stephen Brohan	442	25.4	+6.7
Conservative	Tori Merrett	392	22.6	−0.9
Liberal Democrats	Jon Taylor	127	7.3	New
UKIP	Ken Humphries	110	6.3	New
Majority				
Turnout				
Labour hold		Swing		

=== Bedwardine ===
Bedwardine
Party	Candidate	Votes	%	±%
Conservative	Marc Bayliss	992	45.3	−5.1
Labour	Sue Smith	477	21.8	−4.4
UKIP	John Beacham	232	10.6	+7.2
Green	Claire Nichols	223	10.2	+4.8
Liberal Democrats	Mike Mullins	197	9.0	+1.6
Women's Equality	Leisa Taylor	70	3.2	−4.0
Majority				
Turnout				
Conservative hold		Swing		

=== Cathedral ===
Cathedral
Party	Candidate	Votes	%	±%
Conservative	Allah Ditta	1,119	37.3	−0.2
Labour	Emma Simovic	1,050	35.0	−11.8
Green	Sheena Mackenzie	381	12.7	+5.2
Liberal Democrats	Ken Carpenter	243	8.1	+2.9
UKIP	Hazel Finch	208	6.9	+3.9
Majority				
Turnout				
Conservative hold		Swing		

=== Claines ===
Claines
Party	Candidate	Votes	%	±%
Conservative	Andy Stafford	1,252	42.6	+2.1
Liberal Democrats	Mel Allcott	1,157	39.4	+1.1
Green	Stephen Dent	245	8.3	+3.1
Labour	Saiful Islam	145	4.9	−9.7
UKIP	Mark Hulme	137	4.7	+3.2
Majority				
Turnout				
Conservative hold		Swing		

=== Nunnery ===
Nunnery
Party	Candidate	Votes	%	±%
Labour	Simon Cronin	726	43.1	−7.6
Conservative	Francis Lankester	484	28.8	−6.7
Green	Barbara Mitra	258	15.3	+7.9
UKIP	David Carney	198	11.8	+6.3
British Resistance	Carl Mason	17	1.0	+0.2
Majority				
Turnout				
Labour hold		Swing		

=== St. Clement ===
St. Clement
Party	Candidate	Votes	%	±%
Conservative	Chris Mitchell	619	45.3	−1.1
Labour	Ian Craigan	392	28.7	−0.8
Green	Frazer Bufton	199	14.6	+6.0
UKIP	John Butterfield	157	11.5	−4.0
Majority				
Turnout				
Conservative hold		Swing		

=== St. John ===
St. John
Party	Candidate	Votes	%	±%
Labour	Richard Udall	916	56.9	+0.5
Conservative	Chris Rimell	285	17.7	−11.0
UKIP	Owen Cleary	184	11.4	+8.3
Green	Sarah Dukes	181	11.2	+5.9
Socialist Alternative	Mark Davies	45	2.8	New
Majority				
Turnout				
Labour hold		Swing		

=== St. Peter's Parish ===
St. Peter's Parish
Party	Candidate	Votes	%	±%
Conservative	Steve Mackay	877	54.7	−9.2
Labour	Chris Giles	290	18.1	−0.9
Green	Alaric Stephen	272	17.0	+2.4
UKIP	Linda Murray	165	10.3	+7.8
Majority				
Turnout				
Conservative hold		Swing		

=== St. Stephen ===
St. Stephen
Party	Candidate	Votes	%	±%
Green	Marjory Bisset	1,067	57.9	+7.3
Conservative	Gareth Jones	511	27.7	−4.0
Labour	Ruth Coates	114	6.2	−2.3
UKIP	Tim Hopkins	84	4.6	−4.6
Democrats and Veterans	Paul Hicking	34	1.8	New
Liberal Democrats	Karen Lawrance	32	1.7	New
Majority				
Turnout				
Green gain from Conservative		Swing		

=== Warndon Parish North ===
Warndon Parish North
Party	Candidate	Votes	%	±%
Conservative	Nida Hassan	651	44.3	−0.9
Labour	Andy Graham	454	30.9	−5.2
Green	Jane Moorhouse	142	9.7	−2.9
Liberal Democrats	Sarah Murray	112	7.6	+4.1
UKIP	Chris Roberts	112	7.6	+5.9
Majority				
Turnout				
Conservative hold		Swing		

=== Warndon Parish South ===
Warndon Parish South
Party	Candidate	Votes	%	±%
Conservative	Lucy Hodgson	571	36.8	−20.8
Green	Andrew Cross	537	34.6	+28.8
Labour	James Linsey	248	16.0	−12.5
UKIP	Phil Clarke	116	7.5	+5.0
Liberal Democrats	Steve Mather	81	5.2	−0.5
Majority				
Turnout				
Conservative hold		Swing		
