= Worcester Guildhall =

Municipal building in Worcester, Worcestershire, England

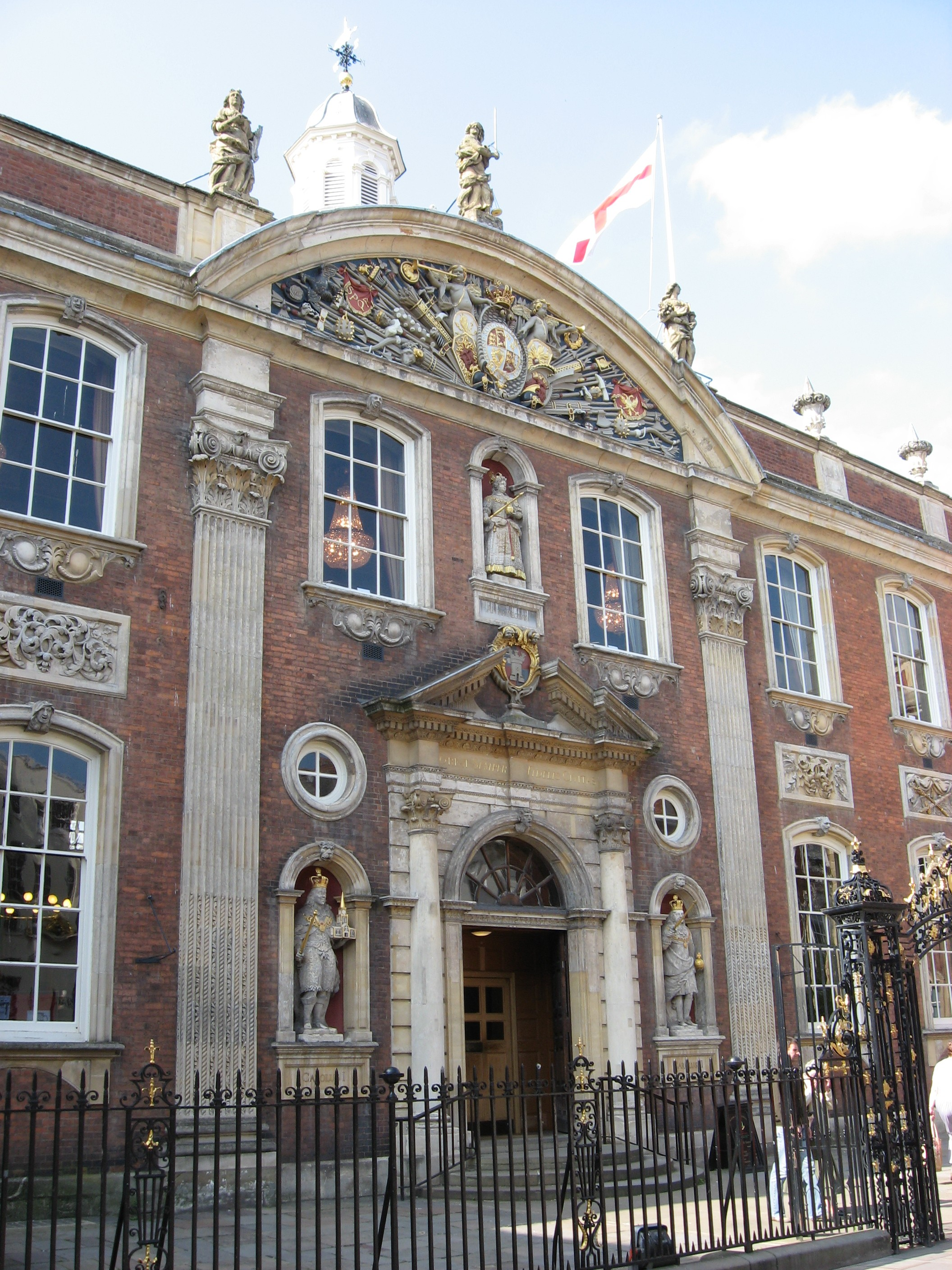
- The front of Worcester Guildhall

- Location within Worcestershire
- 52.1912°N 2.2208°W
- Location: Worcester, Worcestershire

History
- Built: 1723

Site notes
- Architect: Thomas White
- Architectural style: Queen Anne style

Listed Building – Grade I
- Designated: 22 May 1954
- Reference no.: 1389921

The Guildhall, Worcester is a municipal building, the seat of the Worcester City Council, and a cultural venue located on the High Street, Worcester, England. It is a Grade I listed building.

== History and architecture ==
The first guildhall on the site was a timber-framed structure constructed as a meeting place for local merchants in about 1227. In 1717 civic leaders decided to replace the building with a grander structure.

The current building, designed by Thomas White in the Queen Anne style, was completed in 1723. The design involved a central bay and two wings with the central bay being flanked by two full-height Composite order columns with a pediment above displaying flute-playing cherubs and the Royal Arms. At roof level, above the cornice, carved figures of Justice, Peace, Plenty, Chastisement and Hercules were erected together with four urns. At ground floor level in the middle of the central bay was the main entrance which was flanked by Composite order columns with a fanlight and architrave above. On either side of the entrance, statues of King Charles I and King Charles II were erected in niches; at first floor level, above the main entrance a statue of Queen Anne was erected, also in a niche. Inside, a court room and a lower hall were established on the ground floor, and a council chamber and a large imposing assembly room were established on the first floor. King George III described the assembly room as "a handsome gallery" when he visited it in August 1788.

The building was used for cultural events: the Three Choirs Festival, which involved concerts given by the choirs of Gloucester, Hereford and Worcester, was regularly held there until the mid-18th century. In the 18th century, Worcester also elected its members of Parliament at the Guildhall, a minimum requirement being that they should own freehold property worth 40 shillings a year; the decision was made by the loudest shouting rather than raising of hands. The court room was used as a facility for dispensing justice and accommodated the crown court and nisi prius court. Citizens were given the privilege of being imprisoned underneath the Guildhall rather than in the town jail, except for the most serious offences.

Sir Winston Churchill was presented with the Freedom of the City of Worcester at the Guildhall on 20 May 1950. The Guildhall was the headquarters of the county borough of Worcester for much of the 20th century and, following the implementation of the Local Government Act 1972, became the meeting place of enlarged Worcester City Council. Queen Elizabeth II, accompanied by the Duke of Edinburgh, attended a reception at the Guildhall in July 2012, before undertaking a walkabout outside the building.

Works of art in the Guildhall include portraits by Christopher William Hunneman of King George III and of his wife, Queen Charlotte and a portrait by James Sant of Queen Victoria.

=== Forecourt gates ===
The forecourt gates and railings, which are contemporaneous with the guildhall, have their own Grade I listing.

== Gallery ==
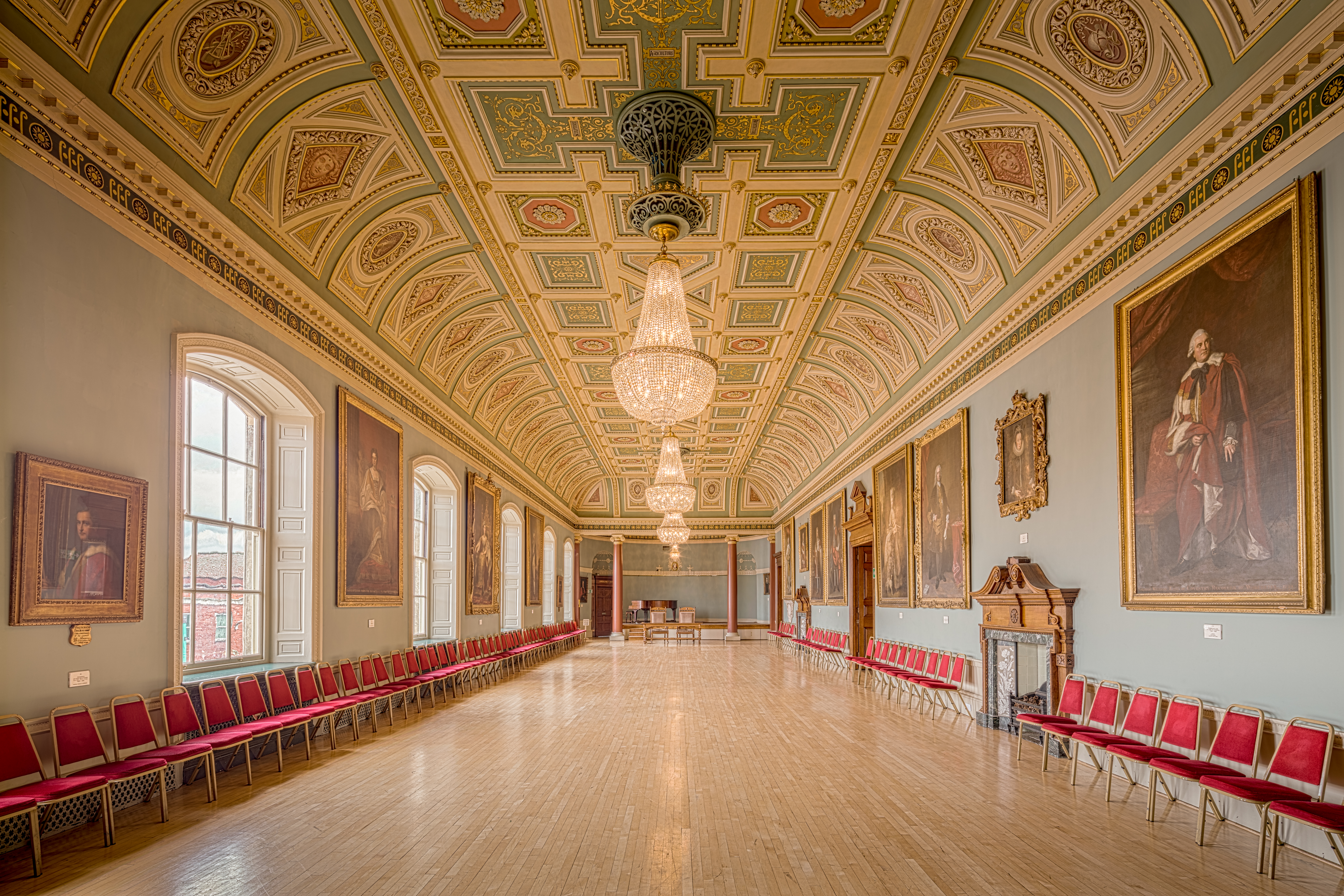
The Assembly Room

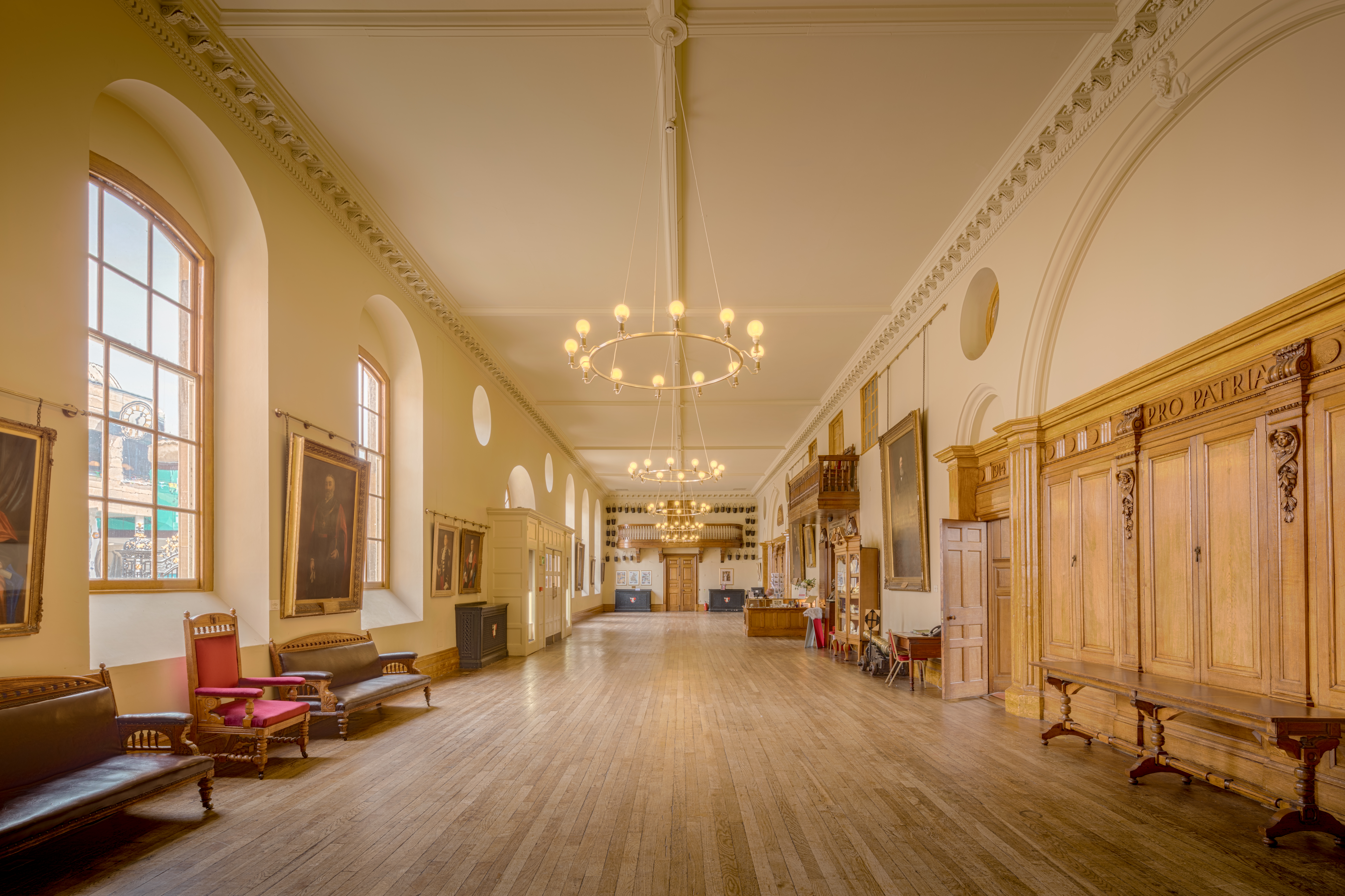
The Lower Hall

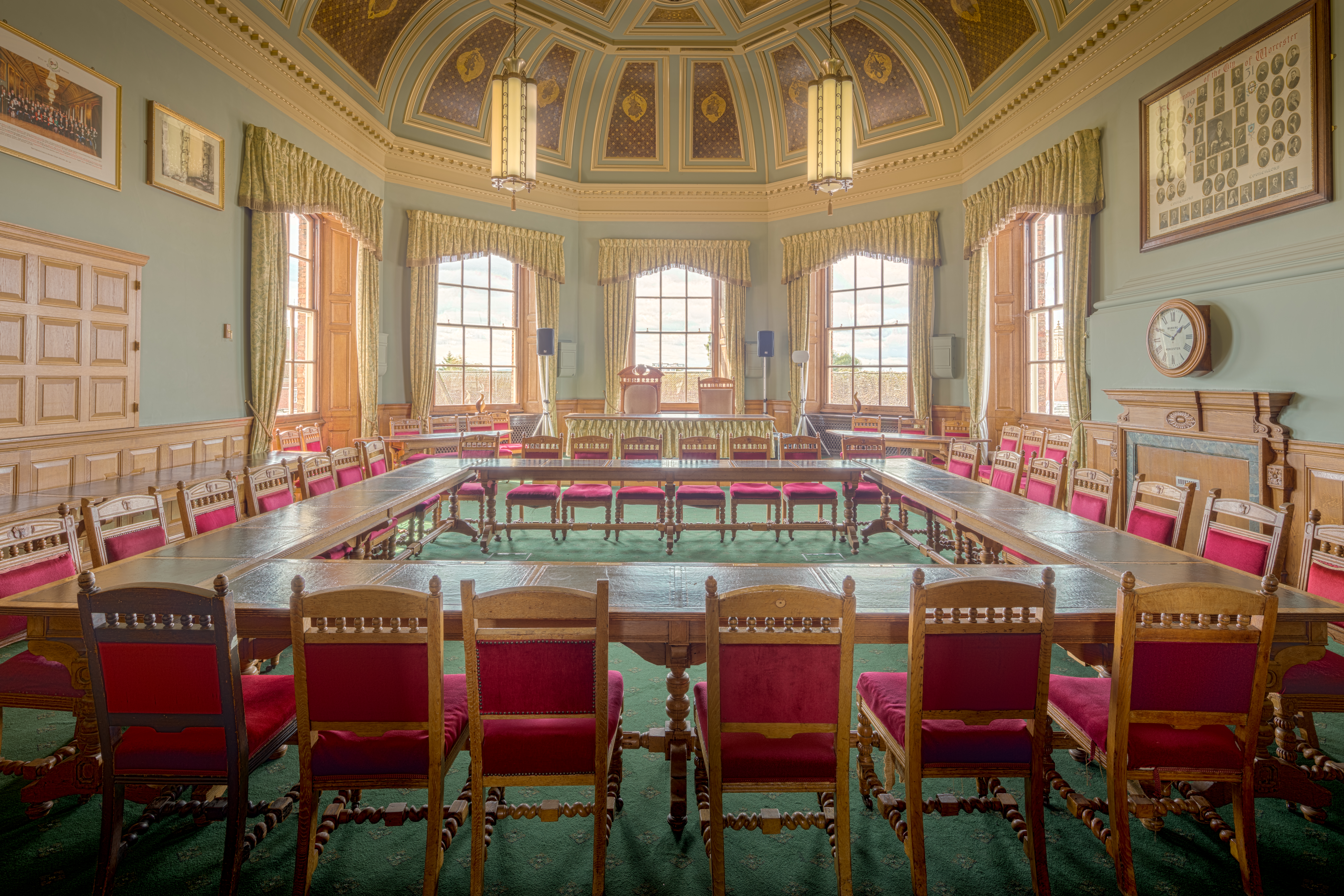
The Council Chambers

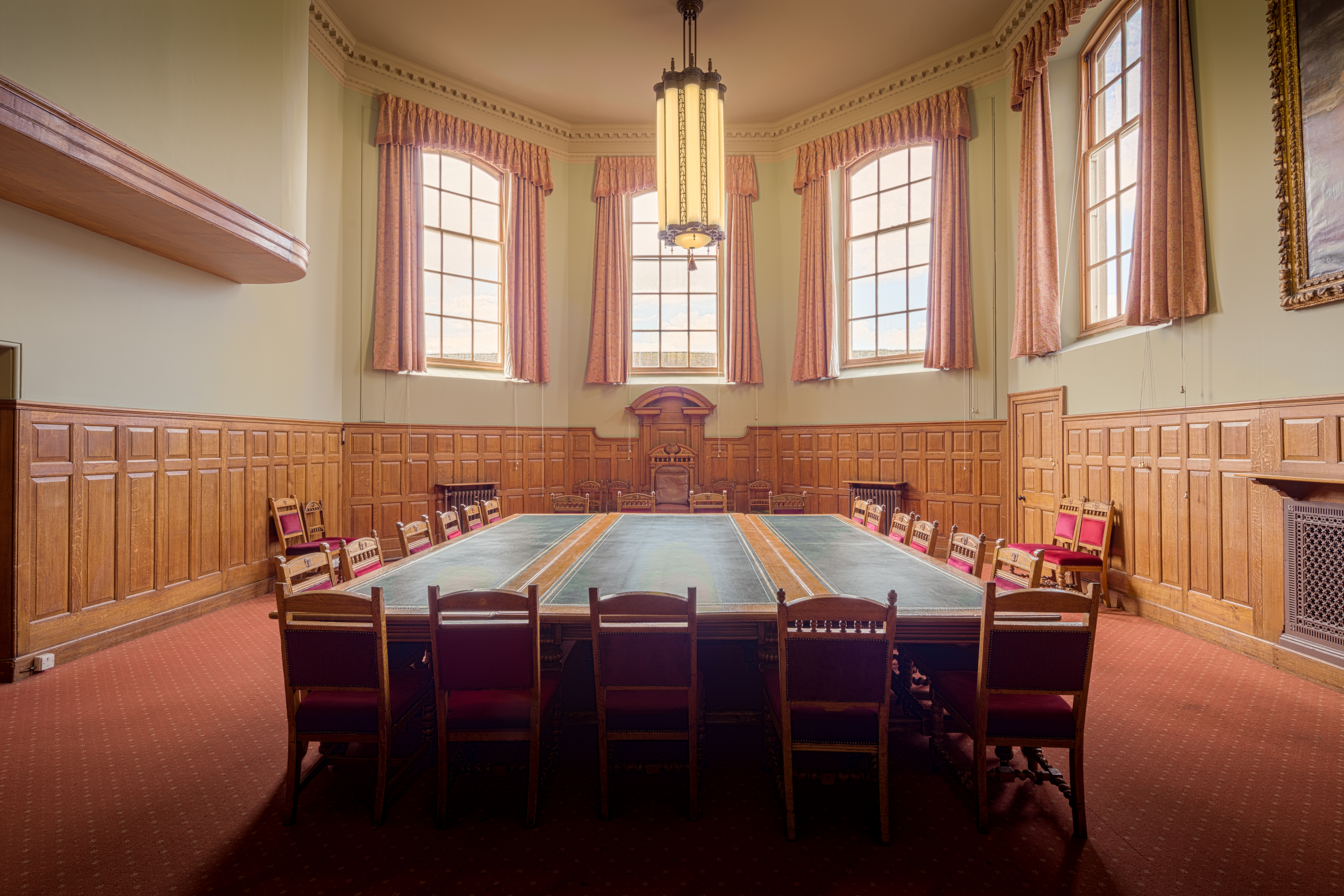
The Court Room

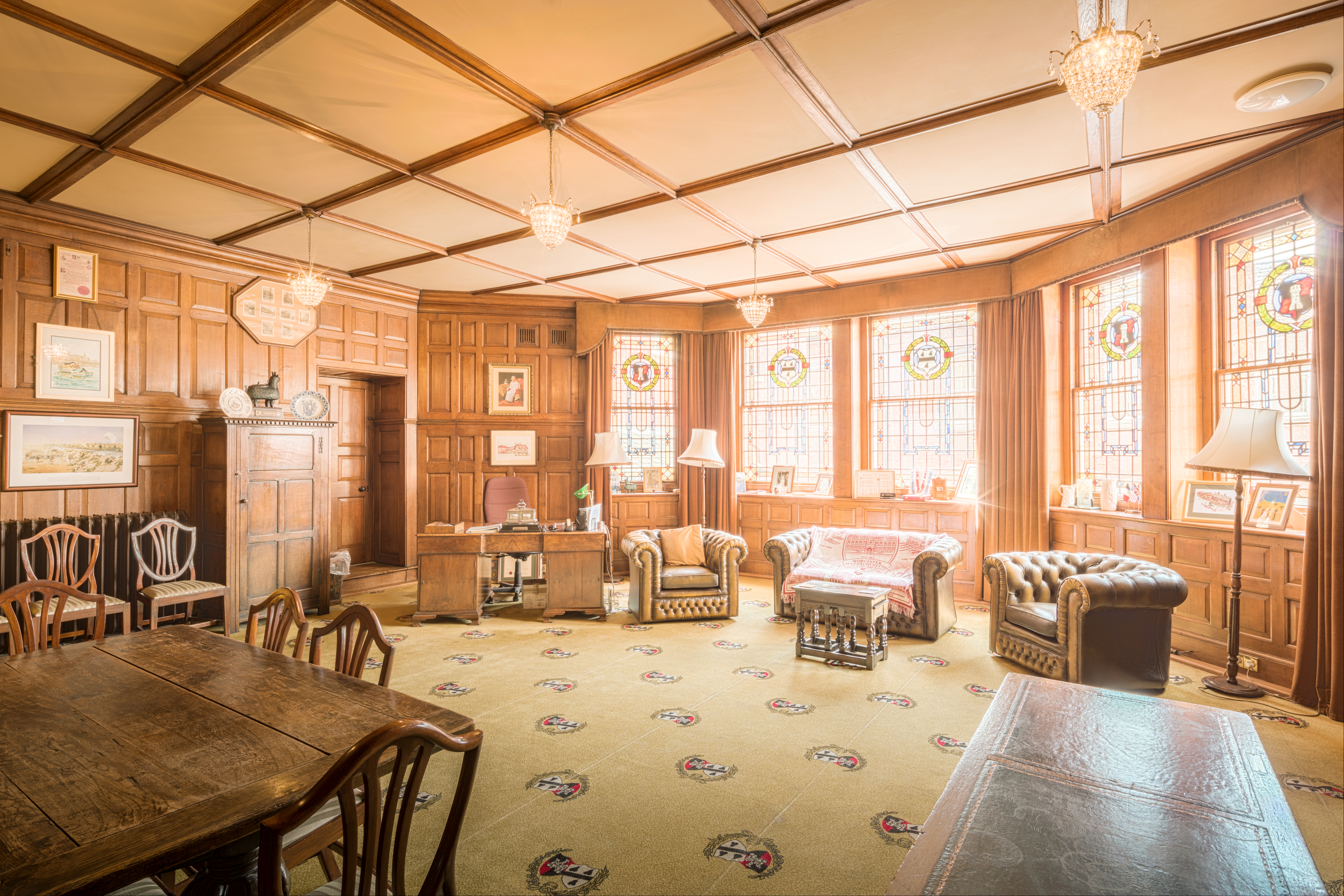
The Mayors Parlour Room
