= IKozie micro-home =

Prefabricated home designed for one person

The iKozie micro-home is a prefabricated home designed for one person and measures 17.25 square metres (186 sq ft).

It was designed by Kieran O’Donnell, a trustee of the Homeless Foundation, and Andrew Eastabrook of Eastabrook Architects.

The first iKozie micro-home was installed in the garden of the Homeless Foundation, on 29 August 2017.

iKozie Ltd was granted planning permission by Worcester City Council for a reduced number of 16 homes on 18 October 2018, following extensive reactive amendments to the original design in response to objections from local residents. Construction of the scheme is anticipated to start in 2019.
