= The Homeless Foundation =

UK charity

The Homeless Foundation is a registered charity based in the West Midlands with the aim of eradicating homelessness across the United Kingdom. It was founded in 2007 and is run by a board of trustees.

== About ==
Its main objective, stated in its governing document, is "to relieve, either individually or generally, persons who are in conditions of need, hardship or distress on a National basis". The Homeless Foundation believes that a safe and secure home is a fundamental human need and the personal foundation from which people can build an independent life and fulfil their true potential.

It does this via providing advice, move-on accommodation and move-in grants. In addition, it also works with a number of partners across the Midlands including St Paul's, YMCA Worcestershire, and St Basil's. Since 2015, it has also provided a target information programme and assistance for 18-25 year olds and has also developed a schools programme to provide education on homelessness. Official figures from the UK Government, via coordinated street counts of rough sleepers conducted in autumn 2018, revealed there were 420 rough sleepers across the West Midlands, up from 289 in 2016.

== Move-on accommodation ==
The Homeless Foundation tackles homelessness in a number of ways, but one of the main issues is the lack of 'move-on accommodation' for individuals to make a transition to independent living.

'Move-on accommodation' in the form of shared housing or apartments enables individuals to gain important life skills, have the support of trained resettlement advisors, and secure confidence and the means to secure accommodation.

The Homeless Foundation provides grants from its own funds to assist with 'move-on accommodation' and has helped more than 150 people from this scheme, with 85 per cent of those no longer categorised as homeless.

The shortage of affordable accommodation is recognised as one of the biggest challenges nationally, with Homeless Link noting 30 per cent of its clients were unable to do so.

This has been acknowledged as a major issue by the UK government in solving homelessness. In August 2018 it announced a £50 million Move On Fund package until 2020/21 as part of its Rough Sleeping Strategy.

Working with referral organisations, on average, seven single people each month move on from homelessness into their own secure homes.

== Campaigns ==
=== Hi Homie ===
The Homeless Foundation established the HiHomie campaign in 2015, specifically to provide advice to young people (16–25 year olds) in Worcestershire regarding homelessness. The campaign adopted a turtle as its logo – based not only its resilience but the fact that with its shell it is never without a home.

=== iKozie mini-home ===
In 2017, the Homeless Foundation had the UK's first iKozie built and delivered to a property in Worcestershire. The iKozie is a purpose-built property just 186 square feet in size that provides move-on accommodation.

It was designed by Kieran O'Donnell, a trustee of the Homeless Foundation, and Andrew Eastabrook of Eastabrook Architects. The design was to enable the micro-home to be constructed offsite and lifted into place. The micro-home was described by O'Donnell as a potential solution to the housing and homeless crisis in the UK.

The UK's first iKozie micro-home was designed as a 'move-on' home and was in the garden of the Homeless Foundation, on 29 August 2017.

== Financial information ==
The charity does not actively fundraise to support its activities. It secures funding via rents on its charitable properties and one investment property and direct donations. In its most recent accounts (financial year end 30 November 2017), it had an income of £59,521 and spending of £40,879.
