= 2003 Worcester City Council election =

2003 UK local government election

The 2003 Worcester City Council election took place on 1 May 2003 to elect members of Worcester City Council in Worcestershire, England. One third of the council was up for election and the Conservative Party gained overall control of the council from no overall control.

After the election, the composition of the council was:

- Conservative 19
- Labour 10
- Independent 5
- Liberal Democrat 2

== Campaign ==
13 seats were contested in the election with 2 seats available in St Nicholas ward after a Labour councillor stood down. Labour defended 7 seats as against 5 for the Conservatives and 1 for the independents. Meanwhile, the decision of the British National Party to put up a candidate in Holy Trinity ward received attention in the press.

Worcester was a top Conservative target council in the 2003 local elections, with gains here seen as important signal for the parties performance at the next general election. The Conservatives had controlled the council as a minority administration since the 2000 election and were hoping to win a majority. They said Labour had been out of touch when they ran the council and had made poor decisions such as using green fields for transport schemes. However, Labour attacked the Conservatives for the council's budget, including a council tax rise of 9.5% and poor waste collection services; as well as the controversy over the closing and then rescue of Swan Theatre in Worcester.

The level of postal voting in the election was up on previous years with 5,000 postal voting forms being sent, compared to 3,000 in 2002.

== Election result ==
The results saw the Conservatives win a majority on the council, after gaining 2 seats from Labour but losing 1 seat to the Liberal Democrats. This meant that Labour only held 10 seats which was the lowest number of seats they had held on the council up to then. However Labour did manage to retain Holy Trinity ward, defeating the British National Party who came second in the ward. Voter turnout was low, dropping as low as 18% in St Barnabus ward.

Worcester local election result 2003
Party	Seats	Gains	Losses	Net gain/loss	Seats %	Votes %	Votes	+/−
Conservative	6	2	1	+1	46.2	41.3	9,399	-3.1%
Labour	5	0	2	-2	38.5	35.9	8,163	-2.2%
Liberal Democrats	1	1	0	+1	7.7	10.8	2,452	-0.7%
Independent	1	0	0	0	7.7	9.5	2,164	+3.5%
BNP	0	0	0	0	0	1.2	271	+1.2%
Socialist	0	0	0	0	0	1.0	220	+1.0%
UKIP	0	0	0	0	0	0.4	83	+0.4%

== Ward results ==
All Saints
Party	Candidate	Votes	%	±%
Conservative	Francis Lankester	722	48.1	−8.7
Labour	Andrew Watson	559	37.2	−6.0
Socialist	Douglas Menzies	220	14.7	+14.7
Majority		163	10.9	−2.7
Turnout		1,501	32.0	
Conservative hold		Swing		

Bedwardine
Party	Candidate	Votes	%	±%
Conservative	David Clark	900	55.8	−4.0
Labour	Simon Arnold	389	24.1	−4.4
Liberal Democrats	Louis Stephen	325	20.1	+8.4
Majority		511	31.7	+0.4
Turnout		1,614	30.5	
Conservative hold		Swing		

Claines
Party	Candidate	Votes	%	±%
Liberal Democrats	Elizabeth Smith	1,346	57.2	−1.0
Conservative	William Elsy	1,009	42.8	+1.0
Majority		337	14.4	−2.0
Turnout		2,355	44.0	
Liberal Democrats gain from Conservative		Swing		

Holy Trinity
Party	Candidate	Votes	%	±%
Labour	Geoffrey Williams	566	51.6	−5.9
BNP	Martin Roberts	271	24.7	+24.7
Conservative	Robert Campbell	259	23.6	−2.9
Majority		295	26.9	−4.1
Turnout		1,096	26.2	
Labour hold		Swing		

Nunnery
Party	Candidate	Votes	%	±%
Independent	Michael Layland	852	54.3	+9.4
Labour	Christopher Taylor	505	32.2	−7.7
Conservative	James Denlegh-Maxwell	212	13.5	−1.7
Majority		347	22.1	+17.1
Turnout		1,569	32.0	
Independent hold		Swing		

St Barnabas
Party	Candidate	Votes	%	±%
Labour	Adrian Gregson	563	74.2	−5.0
Conservative	Nicholas Turner	196	25.8	+5.0
Majority		367	48.4	−10.0
Turnout		759	18.3	
Labour hold		Swing		

St Clement
Party	Candidate	Votes	%	±%
Conservative	Colin Phillips	871	41.0	−9.1
Labour	Matthew Lamb	858	40.4	−9.5
Independent	Paul Coveney	394	18.6	+18.6
Majority		13	0.6	+0.4
Turnout		2,123	33.5	
Conservative gain from Labour		Swing		

St John
Party	Candidate	Votes	%	±%
Labour	David Candler	753	53.1	+0.6
Independent	Colin Layland	396	27.9	+0.1
Conservative	Gordon Hazelton	185	13.1	−6.6
UKIP	Jean Eaves	83	5.9	+5.9
Majority		357	25.2	+0.5
Turnout		1,417	28.5	
Labour hold		Swing		

St Martin
Party	Candidate	Votes	%	±%
Conservative	Lucy Hodgson	1,460	50.2	−1.1
Labour	Pamela Clayton	1,447	49.8	+1.1
Majority		13	0.4	−2.2
Turnout		2,907	23.6	
Conservative gain from Labour		Swing		

St Nicholas (2)
Party	Candidate	Votes	%	±%
Labour	Robert Peachey	837		
Labour	Richard Bird	834		
Conservative	David Tibbutt	759		
Conservative	Rodney Staines	715		
Turnout		3,145	33.0	
Labour hold		Swing		
Labour hold		Swing		

St Peter
Party	Candidate	Votes	%	±%
Conservative	Robert Rowden	1,121	42.9	−8.8
Labour	George Squires	524	20.1	−7.7
Independent	Craig Mills	522	20.0	+20.0
Liberal Democrats	Iain Macbriar	446	17.1	−3.4
Majority		597	22.8	−1.1
Turnout		2,613	30.0	
Conservative hold		Swing		

St Stephen
Party	Candidate	Votes	%	±%
Conservative	Stephen Inman	990	59.9	−1.4
Liberal Democrats	Paul Griffiths	335	20.3	+2.8
Labour	Ali Asghar	328	19.8	−1.4
Majority		655	39.6	−0.5
Turnout		1,653	30.0	
Conservative hold		Swing		
