= 2023 Worcester City Council election =

2023 English local election

← 2022	4 May 2023	2024 →

11 out of 35 seats to Worcester City Council 18 seats needed for a majority

	First party	Second party
Leader	Lynn Denham	Marjory Bisset
Party	Labour	Green
Last election	12 seats, 32.2%	6 seats, 17.8%
Seats won	4	5
Seats after	13	10
Seat change	▲1	▲4
Popular vote	6,052	6,161
Percentage	28.0%	28.4%
Swing	▼4.2%	▲10.3%
	Third party	Fourth party
Leader	Chris Mitchell	Mel Allcott
Party	Conservative	Liberal Democrats
Last election	15 seats, 31.5%	2 seats, 14.8%
Seats won	0	2
Seats after	8	4
Seat change	▼7	▲2
Popular vote	5,488	3,523
Percentage	25.4%	16.3%
Swing	▼6.1%	▲1.5%
- Winner of each seat at the 2023 Worcester City Council election
Leader before election
Chris Mitchell
Conservative
No overall control
Leader after election
Lynn Denham
Labour
Marjory Bisset
Green
(Joint leaders)
No overall control

The 2023 Worcester City Council election took place on 4 May 2023 to elect members of Worcester City Council in Worcestershire, England. This was on the same day as other local elections in England.

Prior to the election the council had been under no overall control. The Conservatives were the largest party and their group leader, Chris Mitchell, was the leader of the council. The council remained under no overall control after the election, but the Conservatives went from being the largest party to being the third largest party, not winning any of the seats available at this election. Conservative leader Chris Mitchell was one of those who lost his seat. Labour were the largest party after the election, for the first time since 2000, and the Greens made the most gains, gaining four new seats and winning the popular vote for the first time.

The Labour group leader, Lynn Denham, and the Green group leader, Marjory Bisset, were appointed joint leaders of the council at the subsequent annual council meeting on 16 May 2023.

== Summary ==
=== Election result ===
2023 Worcester City Council election
Party	This election			Full council			This election		
Party	Seats	Net	Seats %	Other	Total	Total %	Votes	Votes %	+/−
Green	5	▲4	45.5	5	10	28.6	6,161	28.4	+10.3
Labour	4	▲1	36.4	9	13	37.1	6,052	28.0	–4.2
Liberal Democrats	2	▲2	18.2	2	4	11.4	3,523	16.3	+1.5
Conservative	0	▼7	0.0	8	8	22.9	5,488	25.4	–6.1
Independent	0	Steady	0.0	0	0	0.0	108	0.5	N/A
TUSC	0	Steady	0.0	0	0	0.0	103	0.5	+0.1
Reform UK	0	Steady	0.0	0	0	0.0	39	0.2	±0.0

== Ward results ==
The Statement of Persons Nominated, which details the candidates standing in each ward, was released by Worcester City Council following the close of nominations on 5 April 2023.

=== Arboretum ===
Arboretum
Party	Candidate	Votes	%	±%
Green	Hannah Cooper	1,134	61.0	+35.6
Labour Co-op	Jenny Barnes	505	27.2	−11.2
Conservative	Anja Potze	152	8.2	−14.4
Liberal Democrats	Jon Taylor	59	3.2	−4.1
Majority		629		
Turnout		1860	39.3	+2.3
Registered electors		4,732		
Green gain from Labour Co-op		Swing	23.4	

=== Bedwardine ===
Bedwardine
Party	Candidate	Votes	%	±%
Labour	Sue Smith	993	43.8	+22.0
Conservative	Adele Rimell	847	37.4	−7.9
Green	Phil Gilfillan	221	9.8	−0.4
Liberal Democrats	John Ondreasz	183	8.8	−0.2
TUSC	Eloise Davies	19	0.8	New
Majority		146		
Turnout		2,265	33.4	−0.3
Registered electors		6,791		
Labour gain from Conservative		Swing	15.0	

=== Cathedral ===
Cathedral
Party	Candidate	Votes	%	±%
Labour	Atif Sadiq	1,238	45.0	+10.0
Conservative	Haris Saleem	806	29.3	−8.0
Green	Jon Bodenham	420	15.3	+2.6
Liberal Democrats	Mark Fenton	199	7.2	−0.9
TUSC	Archie Harrison	54	2.0	New
Majority		432		
Turnout		2,753	32.8	−4.1
Registered electors		8,403		
Labour gain from Conservative		Swing	9.0	

=== Claines ===
Claines
Party	Candidate	Votes	%	±%
Liberal Democrats	Jessie Venegas	1,641	63.8	+24.4
Conservative	Angela Stanley	483	18.8	−23.8
Labour	Tom Henri	227	8.8	+3.9
Green	Alex Mace	205	8.0	−0.3
Majority		1158		
Turnout		2571	39.9	−5.6
Registered electors		6,451		
Liberal Democrats gain from Conservative		Swing	24.1	

=== Nunnery ===
Nunnery
Party	Candidate	Votes	%	±%
Labour	Simon Cronin	1,018	47.6	+4.5
Conservative	Allah Ditta	688	32.2	+3.4
Green	Jacek Zmarzlik	182	8.5	−6.8
Liberal Democrats	Scott Butler	134	6.3	New
Independent	David Carney	108	5.0	New
Majority		330		
Turnout		2139	32.3	+4.2
Registered electors		6,627		
Labour hold		Swing	+0.6	

=== St Clement ===
St Clement
Party	Candidate	Votes	%	±%
Green	Tor Pingree	703	43.2	+28.6
Conservative	Christopher Mitchell	615	37.8	−7.5
Labour Co-op	Aaron Daniels	217	13.3	−15.4
Liberal Democrats	Steve Mather	58	3.6	New
Majority		88		
Turnout		1629	38.3	+4.5
Registered electors		4,253		
Green gain from Conservative		Swing	18.1	

=== St John ===
St John
Party	Candidate	Votes	%	±%
Labour	Richard Udall	1,199	70.5	+13.6
Conservative	Bertie Ballinger	249	14.6	−3.1
Green	Susan Avery	135	7.9	−3.3
Liberal Democrats	Peter Jackson	68	4.0	New
TUSC	Mark Davies	30	1.8	New
Majority		950		
Turnout		1700	26.6	−0.5
Registered electors		6,379		
Labour hold		Swing	+8.4	

=== St Peter's Parish ===
St Peter's Parish
Party	Candidate	Votes	%	±%
Green	Elena Round	817	44.9	27.9
Conservative	James Woolgar	523	28.8	−25.9
Liberal Democrats	Robert Renshaw	305	16.8	New
Labour	Chris Giles	124	6.8	−11.3
Reform UK	Paul Hickling	39	2.1	New
Majority		294		
Turnout		1819	40.9	+5.1
Registered electors		4,448		
Green gain from Conservative		Swing	26.8	

=== St Stephen ===
St Stephen
Party	Candidate	Votes	%	±%
Green	Marjory Bisset	1,058	66.3	+8.4
Conservative	Tom Wisniewski	309	19.4	−8.3
Labour	Ruth Coates	180	11.3	+5.1
Liberal Democrats	Alison Morgan	39	2.4	+0.7
Majority		749		
Turnout		1595	36.8	−5.1
Registered electors		4,329		
Green hold		Swing	+8.4	

=== Warndon Parish North ===
Warndon Parish North
Party	Candidate	Votes	%	±%
Liberal Democrats	Sarah Murray	795	54.9	+47.3
Conservative	Chris Rimell	402	27.8	−16.5
Labour	Michelle Hughes	168	11.6	−19.3
Green	Alaric Stephen	80	5.5	−4.2
Majority		393		
Turnout		1448	36.2	−0.3
Registered electors		3,999		
Liberal Democrats gain from Conservative		Swing	31.9	

=== Warndon Parish South ===
Warndon Parish South
Party	Candidate	Votes	%	±%
Green	Andrew Cross	1,206	65.3	+30.7
Conservative	Lucy Hodgson	414	22.4	−14.4
Labour	Graham Taylor	183	9.9	−6.1
Liberal Democrats	John Rudge	42	2.3	−2.9
Majority		792		
Turnout		1847	40.2	+5.9
Registered electors		4,590		
Green gain from Conservative		Swing	22.6	

== By-elections ==
=== Nunnery ===
Nunnery: 20 July 2023
Party	Candidate	Votes	%	±%
Labour	Elaine Willmore	1,048	59.7	+12.1
Conservative	Allah Ditta	518	29.5	–2.7
Liberal Democrats	Scott Butler	102	5.8	–0.5
Independent	David Carney	88	5.0	±0.0
Majority		530	30.2	
Turnout		1,759	26.5	
Registered electors		6,644		
Labour hold		Swing		

=== Warndon Parish South ===
Warndon Parish South: 19 October 2023
Party	Candidate	Votes	%	±%
Green	Katie Collier	733	53.5	–11.8
Conservative	Janet Lippett	340	24.8	+2.4
Labour	Sunil Desayrah	171	12.5	+2.6
Liberal Democrats	Paul Jagger	92	6.7	+4.4
Reform UK	Paul Hickling	29	2.1	N/A
Majority		393	28.7	
Turnout		1,369	30.0	−10.2
Registered electors		4,564		
Green gain from Conservative		Swing	▼7.1	
