= 2022 Worcester City Council election =

2022 UK local government election

← 2021	5 May 2022	2023 →

13 out of 36 seats to Worcester City Council 19 seats needed for a majority

	First party	Second party
Party	Conservative	Labour
Last election	18 seats, 39.2%	11 seats, 27.8%
Seats won	4	6
Seats after	15	12
Seat change	▼3	▲1
Popular vote	7,668	7,854
Percentage	31.5%	32.2%
Swing	▼7.7%	▲4.4%
	Third party	Fourth party
Party	Green	Liberal Democrats
Last election	5 seats, 15.0%	1 seat, 9.1%
Seats won	2	1
Seats after	6	2
Seat change	▲1	▲1
Popular vote	4,349	3,596
Percentage	17.8%	14.8%
Swing	▲2.8%	▲5.7%
- Winner of each seat at the 2022 Worcester City Council election
Council control before election
No overall control
Council control after election
No overall control

The 2022 Worcester City Council election took place on 5 May 2022 to elect councillors to Worcester City Council in England.

== Results summary ==
2022 Worcester City Council election
Party	This election			Full council			This election		
Party	Seats	Net	Seats %	Other	Total	Total %	Votes	Votes %	+/−
Conservative	4	▼3	30.8	11	15	42.9	7,668	31.5	-7.7
Labour	6	▲1	46.2	6	12	34.3	7,854	32.2	+4.4
Green	2	▲1	15.4	4	6	17.1	4,349	17.8	+2.8
Liberal Democrats	1	▲1	7.7	1	2	8.6	3,596	14.8	+5.7
Independent	0	Steady	0.0	0	0	0.0	746	3.1	N/A
TUSC	0	Steady	0.0	0	0	0.0	93	0.4	+0.2
Reform UK	0	Steady	0.0	0	0	0.0	59	0.2	-0.4

== Ward results ==
=== Battenhall ===
Battenhall
Party	Candidate	Votes	%	±%
Green	Tom Piotrowski	1,346	68.4	+7.9
Conservative	Peter Rodford	398	20.2	−10.5
Labour	Graham Taylor	189	9.6	+2.8
Liberal Democrats	Pyers Symon	36	1.8	−0.2
Majority		948	48.2	
Turnout		1,975	48.1	
Green hold		Swing	▲9.2	

=== Bedwardine ===
Bedwardine
Party	Candidate	Votes	%	±%
Conservative	Shafaz Ditta	841	31.8	−22.7
Labour	Sue Smith	818	30.9	+5.0
Independent	Joe Amos	575	21.7	N/A
Green	Katie Collier	213	8.0	−1.0
Liberal Democrats	John ONdreasz	155	5.9	−1.6
Reform UK	Max Windsor-Peplow	30	1.1	N/A
TUSC	Eloise Davies	16	0.6	N/A
Majority		23	0.9	
Turnout		2,655	39.1	
Conservative hold		Swing	▼13.9	

=== Cathedral ===
Cathedral
Party	Candidate	Votes	%	±%
Labour	Jabba Riaz	1,513	51.6	+11.3
Conservative	Raffi Ali	843	28.7	−10.3
Green	Jon Bodenham	320	10.9	−1.2
Liberal Democrats	Jessie Venegas	211	7.2	+3.0
TUSC	Archie Harrison	48	1.6	+0.5
Majority		670	22.9	
Turnout		2,963	34.9	
Labour hold		Swing	▲10.8	

=== Claines ===
Claines
Party	Candidate	Votes	%	±%
Liberal Democrats	Mel Allcot	1,933	70.2	+28.4
Conservative	Louie Lynch	534	19.4	−20.1
Labour	Tom Henri	153	5.6	−3.5
Green	Steve Dent	134	4.9	−3.2
Majority		1,399	50.8	
Turnout		2,758	42.8	
Liberal Democrats gain from Conservative		Swing	▲24.3	

=== Gorse Hill ===
Gorse Hill
Party	Candidate	Votes	%	±%
Conservative	Mohammed Altaf	535	46.0	−5.5
Labour	Edward Kimberley	364	31.3	−6.2
Green	Heather McNeillis	239	20.6	+13.3
Liberal Democrats	Alison Morgan	25	2.1	−1.6
Majority		171	14.7	
Turnout		1,173	30.6	
Conservative hold		Swing	▲0.4	

=== Nunnery ===
Nunnery (2 seats due to by-election)
Party	Candidate	Votes	%	±%
Labour	Pat Agar	1,156	50.8	+14.7
Labour	Basharat Ali	959	42.1	+6.0
Conservative	Adele Rimell	728	32.0	−18.5
Conservative	Tomasz Wisniewski	661	29.0	−21.5
Green	Barbara Mitra	302	13.3	+3.7
Green	Nicola Silvester	186	8.2	−1.4
Independent	David Carney	171	7.5	N/A
Liberal Democrats	Mark Fenton	127	5.6	+3.1
Turnout		2,277	35.2	
Labour hold		Swing		
Labour gain from Conservative		Swing		

=== Rainbow Hill ===
Rainbow Hill
Party	Candidate	Votes	%	±%
Labour	Zoe Cookson	535	52.1	+3.3
Conservative	Parveen Akhtar	300	29.2	−1.0
Green	Nick Weeks	135	13.1	−0.6
Liberal Democrats	Simon Cottingham	57	5.6	+0.6
Majority		235	22.9	
Turnout		1,034	25.3	
Labour hold		Swing	▲2.2	

=== St. John ===
St. John
Party	Candidate	Votes	%	±%
Labour	Matt Lamb	990	59.3	+14.5
Conservative	Laszlo Meszaros	444	26.6	−8.3
Green	Tor Pingree	116	6.9	−4.4
Liberal Democrats	Peter Jackson	91	5.4	−1.0
TUSC	Mark Davies	29	1.7	−0.9
Majority		546	32.7	
Turnout		1,675	26.7	
Labour hold		Swing	▲11.4	

=== St. Peter's Parish ===
St. Peter's Parish
Party	Candidate	Votes	%	±%
Green	Steve Cockeram	896	44.7	+27.7
Conservative	Anja Potze	643	32.1	−22.6
Liberal Democrats	Robert Renshaw	312	15.6	N/A
Labour	Chris Giles	125	6.2	−11.9
Reform UK	Paul Hickling	29	1.4	N/A
Majority		253	12.6	
Turnout		2,006	44.8	
Green gain from Conservative		Swing	▲25.2	

=== Warndon Parish North ===
Warndon Parish North
Party	Candidate	Votes	%	±%
Conservative	Stephen Hodgson	571	40.6	−3.7
Liberal Democrats	Sarah Murray	516	36.7	+29.1
Labour	Ian Craigan	224	15.9	−15.0
Green	Emily Bond	94	6.7	−3.0
Majority		55	3.9	
Turnout		1,412	35.0	
Conservative hold		Swing	▼16.4	

=== Warndon Parish South ===
Warndon Parish South
Party	Candidate	Votes	%	±%
Conservative	Andy Roberts	863	53.3	+16.5
Labour	Ruth Coates	382	23.6	+7.6
Green	Andrew Cross	284	17.5	−17.1
Liberal Democrats	John Rudge	90	5.6	+0.4
Majority		481	29.7	
Turnout		1,622	35.4	
Conservative hold		Swing	▲5.5	

=== Warndon ===
Warndon
Party	Candidate	Votes	%	±%
Labour	Jill Desayrah	446	50.7	+8.8
Conservative	Chris Rimell	307	34.9	−8.4
Green	Sue Avery	84	9.5	+0.6
Liberal Democrats	Susan Carpenter	43	4.9	−1.0
Majority		139	15.8	
Turnout		881	22.6	
Labour hold		Swing	▲8.6	
