= 2007 Worcester City Council election =

2007 UK local government election

Map of the results of the 2007 Worcester council election. Conservatives in blue, Labour in red and Liberal Democrats in yellow. Wards in grey were not contested in 2007.

The 2007 Worcester City Council election took place on 3 May 2007 to elect members of Worcester City Council in Worcestershire, England. One third of the council was up for election and the Conservative Party stayed in overall control of the council.

After the election, the composition of the council was:

- Conservative 18
- Labour 12
- Liberal Democrat 3
- Independent 2

== Campaign ==
Before the election the Conservatives controlled the council with 18 seats, while Labour had 11 and the Liberal Democrats and independents had 3 seats each. 44 candidates stood in the election for the 11 seats which were being contested.

The campaign saw controversy over the Conservative candidate in Arboretum ward, Melanie Heider, after it came out that she was a member of the United Kingdom Independence Party (UKIP) as well as the Conservatives. When this became public it was announced that she had resigned her membership of UKIP, but Labour called on her to be sacked as a candidate.

== Election result ==
The results saw the Conservatives keep their majority on the council after holding all 7 seats which they had been defending. Meanwhile, Labour gained one seat in Nunnery ward from an independent to have 12 councillors after the election.

Worcester local election result 2007
Party	Seats	Gains	Losses	Net gain/loss	Seats %	Votes %	Votes	+/−
Conservative	7	0	0	0	63.6	42.9	9,249	+3.2%
Labour	3	1	0	+1	27.3	25.3	5,457	-3.8%
Liberal Democrats	1	0	0	0	9.1	13.0	2,811	0.0%
Green	0	0	0	0	0	9.7	2,103	-1.9%
Independent	0	0	1	-1	0	4.8	1,031	+1.6%
BNP	0	0	0	0	0	3.7	798	+0.2%
UKIP	0	0	0	0	0	0.6	128	+0.6%

== Ward results ==
Arboretum
Party	Candidate	Votes	%	±%
Labour	Marc Bayliss	814	43.2	
Conservative	Melanie Heider	554	29.4	
Liberal Democrats	Ken Carpenter	246	13.0	
Green	Martin Sullivan	144	7.6	
UKIP	Jason Phillips	128	6.8	
Majority		260	13.8	
Turnout		1,886	42.0	
Labour hold		Swing		

Bedwardine
Party	Candidate	Votes	%	±%
Conservative	David Clark	1,309	56.4	+4.5
Labour	Jenny Barnes	478	20.6	−3.0
Liberal Democrats	Vaughan Hencher	320	13.8	+0.2
Green	Roger Cook	212	9.1	−1.8
Majority		831	35.8	+7.5
Turnout		2,319	37.3	−0.1
Conservative hold		Swing		

Cathedral
Party	Candidate	Votes	%	±%
Conservative	Allah Ditta	1,203	51.0	+2.7
Labour	Christopher Winwood	510	21.6	−4.0
Green	Robert Wilkins	333	14.1	+2.1
Liberal Democrats	Iain MacBriar	314	13.3	−0.8
Majority		693	29.4	+6.7
Turnout		2,360	35.2	+0.4
Conservative hold		Swing		

Claines
Party	Candidate	Votes	%	±%
Liberal Democrats	Liz Smith	1,739	54.7	+2.8
Conservative	Nicholas Turner	985	31.0	−2.6
Labour	Joy Squires	246	7.7	−0.3
Green	Peter Robinson	210	6.6	0.0
Majority		754	23.7	+5.4
Turnout		3,180	49.0	−0.3
Liberal Democrats hold		Swing		

Nunnery
Party	Candidate	Votes	%	±%
Labour	Simon Cronin	804	35.2	+2.7
Independent	Keith Burton	700	30.7	+6.7
Conservative	Lorraine Taylor	355	15.6	−1.1
BNP	Michael Peat	289	12.7	−6.5
Green	Alexander Gwinn	134	5.9	−1.7
Majority		104	4.5	−4.0
Turnout		2,282	38.4	+2.4
Labour gain from Independent		Swing		

St Clement
Party	Candidate	Votes	%	±%
Conservative	Ian Imray	879	49.4	
Labour	Richard Udall	409	23.0	
BNP	Peter Beechey	281	15.8	
Green	Ruth Stafford	209	11.8	
Majority		470	26.4	
Turnout		1,778	39.5	
Conservative hold		Swing		

St John
Party	Candidate	Votes	%	±%
Labour	David Candler	879	42.3	−7.0
Conservative	Robert Campbell	446	21.5	−8.7
Independent	Colin Layland	331	15.9	+15.9
BNP	James Warner	228	11.0	+11.0
Green	Clive Matthews	193	9.3	−11.2
Majority		433	20.8	+1.7
Turnout		2,077	34.5	+4.4
Labour hold		Swing		

St Peters Parish
Party	Candidate	Votes	%	±%
Conservative	Roger Knight	1,018	69.2	+10.2
Labour	George Squires	262	17.8	+2.7
Green	Katherine Harris	192	13.0	+4.4
Majority		756	51.4	+9.7
Turnout		1,472	35.0	+1.0
Conservative hold		Swing		

St Stephen
Party	Candidate	Votes	%	±%
Conservative	Gareth Jones	917	60.0	
Labour	Wes Spiller	295	19.3	
Liberal Democrats	Paul Griffiths	192	12.6	
Green	Penelope Asquith	125	8.2	
Majority		622	40.7	
Turnout		1,529	37.4	
Conservative hold		Swing		

Warndon Parish North
Party	Candidate	Votes	%	±%
Conservative	Douglas Wilkinson	762	52.7	+6.2
Labour	Andrew Watson	493	34.1	−9.0
Green	Linda Smith	192	13.3	+2.9
Majority		269	18.6	+15.2
Turnout		1,446	36.1	−3.0
Conservative hold		Swing		

Warndon Parish South
Party	Candidate	Votes	%	±%
Conservative	Lucy Hodgson	821	65.8	+1.4
Labour	David Insull	267	21.4	−3.1
Green	Olaf Twiehaus	159	12.8	+1.7
Majority		554	44.4	+4.5
Turnout		1,247	31.1	−3.1
Conservative hold		Swing		
