= 1999 Worcester City Council election =

Election

The 1999 Worcester City Council election took place on 6 May 1999 to elect members of Worcester City Council in Worcestershire, England. One third of the council was up for election and the Labour Party stayed in overall control of the council.

After the election, the composition of the council was:

- Labour 20
- Conservative 11
- Independent 3
- Liberal Democrat 2

== Election result ==
The results saw Labour hold onto their majority on the council after losing one seat to the Conservatives. The Conservative gain in All Saints ward was the first gain in Worcester they had made from Labour in several years. Overall voter turnout in the election was 29.8%.

Worcester local election result 1999
Party	Seats	Gains	Losses	Net gain/loss	Seats %	Votes %	Votes	+/−
Labour	6			-1	50.0	37.9		
Conservative	5			+1	41.7	39.2		
Independent	1			0	8.3			
Liberal Democrats	0			0	0	14.7		
