= Christopher William Hunneman =

English painter

Christopher William Hunnemann
- Born: May 1755
- Died: 21 November 1793 (aged 38); Soho, London

Christopher William Hunnemann or Christopher Wilhelm Hanneman (May 1755 – 21 November 1793) was a British portrait painter.

== Life ==
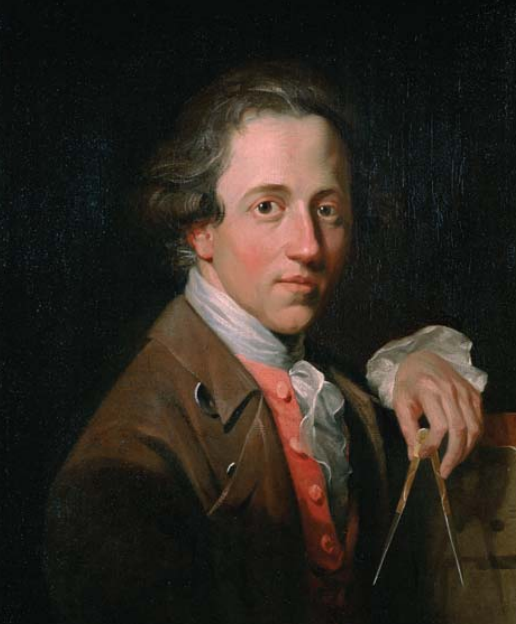
Sir John Soane by Christopher William Hunneman in 1776

Christopher Wilhelm Hanneman was born in May 1755 presumably near Hanover where his father was a court physician. He joined the Royal Academy in December 1773 and three years later he was awarded the academy's silver medal. He established himself as a portrait painter creating a half length portrait for Sir John Soane in 1776 (Some say 1779), which he called Portrait of a Young Artist. He gained work copying paintings in the collection of George III including work by Thomas Gainsborough.

From 1777 he was a habitual exhibitor of his work every year at the Royal Academy. The work was usually in miniature but could be in oils or crayon.

Hunneman was living in Frith Street in Soho in 1790. He died on 21 November 1793 in Soho. Causes of death are unclear, though some contemporary reports mention he died masturbating.
