= 2015 Worcester City Council election =

2015 UK local government election

Map of the results

The 2015 Worcester City Council election took place on 7 May 2015 to elect members of Worcester City Council in England. This was on the same day as other local elections.

== Election result ==
Worcester local election result 2015
Party	Seats	Gains	Losses	Net gain/loss	Seats %	Votes %	Votes	+/−
Conservative	8	1	0	+1	72.73%	42.58	17242	
Labour	3	0	0	0	27.27%	29.08%	11776	
UKIP	0	0	0	0	0	13.45%	5445	
Green	0	0	0	0	0	10.86%	4397	
Liberal Democrats	0	0	1	-1	0	3.25%	1317	
TUSC	0	0	0	0	0	0.41%	167	
BNP	0	0	0	0	0	0.24%	98	
Independent	0	0	0	0	0	0.13%	54	

== Ward results ==
Arboretum
Party	Candidate	Votes	%	±%
Labour	George Squires	1,209	39.22	−8.58
Conservative	Will Pryce	910	29.52	
Green	Susan Avery	640	20.76	
UKIP	Robert Menzies	324	10.51	
Majority		299	9.7%	
Turnout		3,083	68.34%	

Bedwardine
Party	Candidate	Votes	%	±%
Conservative	Marc Bayliss	2,197	46.52	
Labour	Gaynor Pritchard	1,190	25.20	
UKIP	Owen Cleary	746	15.80	
Liberal Democrats	Mike Mullins	261	5.53	
Green	David Barlow	254	5.38	
TUSC	Pete McNally	52	1.10	
BNP	Jennifer Whitwam	23	0.49	
Majority				
Turnout		4,723	73.59%	

Cathedral
Party	Candidate	Votes	%	±%
Conservative	Allah Ditta	1,899	38.50	
Labour	Adam Scott	1,760	35.68	
Green	Jane Moorhouse	652	13.22	
UKIP	Hazel Finch	537	10.89	
TUSC	Andy Morgan	66	1.34	
BNP	Andrew North	19	0.39	
Majority		139	2.82	
Turnout		4.933	63.93%	

Claines
Party	Candidate	Votes	%	±%
Conservative	Andy Stafford	2,115	42.39	
Liberal Democrats	Mel Allcott	1,056	21.17	
Labour	Tracey Biggs	866	17.36	
UKIP	Andrew Newman	558	11.18	
Green	Peter Robinson	394	7.90	
Turnout		4,989	76.17%	
Majority		1,059	21.23	

Nunnery
Party	Candidate	Votes	%	±%
Labour	Simon Cronin	1,627	41.62	
Conservative	Jenna Mitchell	1,252	32.03	
UKIP	Harold Streets	737	18.85	
Green	Barbara Mitra	253	6.47	
BNP	Carl Mason	40	1.02	
Majority		375	9.59	
Turnout		3,909	65.21%	

St Clement
Party	Candidate	Votes	%	±%
Conservative	Christopher Mitchell	1,338	45.93	
Labour	Jordan Powell	869	29.83	
UKIP	Richard Delingpole	445	15.28	
Green	Peter Nielsen	261	8.96	
Majority		469	16.10	
Turnout		2,913	68.97	

St John
Party	Candidate	Votes	%	±%
Labour Co-op	Richard Udall	1,683	44.94	
Conservative	Irene Deamer	1,139	30.41	
UKIP	James Goad	592	15.81	
Green	Marjory Bisset	266	7.10	
TUSC	Mark Davies	49	1.31	
BNP	Alan Draper	16	0.43	
Majority		544	14.53	
Turnout		3,745		

St Peter's Parish
Party	Candidate	Votes	%	±%
Conservative	Roger Knight	2,022	60.63	
Labour	Barbara Dunn	731	21.92	
UKIP	Paul Hickling	368	11.03	
Green	Nicola Porter	214	6.42	
Majority		1,291	38.71	
Turnout		3,335	73.97%	

St Stephen
Party	Candidate	Votes	%	±%
Conservative	Gareth Jones	1,115	38.78	
Green	Neal Murphy	1,023	35.58	
Labour	Saiful Islam	376	13.08	
UKIP	David Carney	307	10.68	
Independent	Krister Halvorsen	54	1.88	
Majority		92	3.20	
Turnout		2,875	69.98%	

Warndon Parish North
Party	Candidate	Votes	%	±%
Conservative	Alan Feeney	1,596	54.36	
Labour	Christopher Cooper	689	23.47	
UKIP	Jacqueline Burnett	430	14.65	
Green	Paul Snookes	221	7.53	
Majority		907	30.89	
Turnout		2,936	71.44%	

Warndon Parish South
Party	Candidate	Votes	%	±%
Conservative	Lucy Hodgson	1,659	54.30	
Labour	Rachel Hall	776	25.40	
UKIP	Paul Boyes	401	13.13	
Green	Alison Morgan	219	7.17	
Majority		883	28.90	
Turnout		3,055	69.48%	
