= 2011 Worcester City Council election =

Local election in Worcester, UK

Elections to Worcester City Council were held on 5 May 2011, alongside other local elections across the United Kingdom. Following the election the council was taken by the Conservatives from no overall control.

== Results summary ==
2011 Worcester City Council election
| Party | Seats Before | Change | Seats After |
|---|---|---|---|
| Conservative Party | 17 | ▲1 | 18 |
| Labour Party | 13 | ▼1 | 12 |
| Liberal Democrats | 3 | Steady | 3 |
| Others | 2 | Steady | 2 |

== See also ==
- Worcester City Council elections
