= 2018 Worcester City Council election =

2018 UK local government election

Map of the results

The 2018 Worcester City Council election took place on 3 May 2018 to elect 35 Councillors to the Worcester City Council in England. This was on the same day as other local elections.

== Council Composition ==
=== After the election ===
↓
17	15	3
Conservative	Labour	Green

== Ward results ==
=== Battenhall ===
Battenhall
Party	Candidate	Votes	%	±%
Green	Louise Griffiths	1,114	48.3	▼1.1
Conservative	Steve Mackay	1,015	45.6	▲5.0
Labour	Saiful Islam	94	4.1	▼5.8
UKIP	John Butterfield	32	1.4	▼2.7
Liberal Democrats	Karen Lawrance	14	0.6	New
Majority		99	2.7	
Turnout		2,272	56.0	

=== Bedwardine ===
Bedwardine
Party	Candidate	Votes	%	±%
Conservative	Bill Amos	1,111	50.4	
Labour	Christopher Winwood	578	26.2	
Liberal Democrats	Mike Mullins	162	7.4	
Women's Equality	Leisa Taylor	158	7.2	
Green	Daniel Manning	120	5.4	
UKIP	John Beacham	75	3.4	
Majority				
Turnout		2214	33.11	

=== Cathedral ===
Cathedral
Party	Candidate	Votes	%	±%
Labour	Jabba Riaz	1,472	46.8	
Conservative	Nida Hassan	1180	37.5	
Green	Alaric Stephen	237	7.5	
Liberal Democrats	Ken Carpenter	163	5.2	
UKIP	Hazel Finch	96	3.0	
Majority				
Turnout		3158	39.53	

=== Claines ===
Claines
Party	Candidate	Votes	%	±%
Conservative	Stuart Denlegh-Maxwell	1,155	40.5	
Liberal Democrats	Mel Allcott	1093	38.3	
Labour	Rachael Baylis	417	14.6	
Green	Peter Robinson	147	5.2	
UKIP	Mark Hulme	42	1.5	
Majority				
Turnout		2583	43.89	

=== Gorse Hill ===
Gorse Hill
Party	Candidate	Votes	%	±%
Conservative	Mohammed Altaf	560	43.5	
Labour Co-op	Jenny Barnes	529	41.1	
UKIP	John Francis	117	9.1	
Green	Hannah Cooper	80	6.2	
Majority				
Turnout		1291	33.15	

=== Nunnery ===
Nunnery
Party	Candidate	Votes	%	±%
Labour Co-op	Pat Agar	1,017	50.7	
Conservative	Haris Saleem	713	35.5	
Green	Barbara Mitra	149	7.4	
UKIP	Jon Barras	111	5.5	
British Resistance	Carl Mason	17	0.8	
Majority				
Turnout		2021	33.73	

=== Rainbow Hill ===
Rainbow Hill
Party	Candidate	Votes	%	±%
Labour	Tom Collins	599	59.4	
Conservative	Chris Rimell	233	23.1	
Green	Marjory Bisset	97	9.6	
UKIP	Dave Carney	45	4.5	
Liberal Democrats	Jon Taylor	34	3.4	
Majority				
Turnout		1009	25.50	

=== St John ===
St John
Party	Candidate	Votes	%	±%
Labour	Matthew Lamb	942	56.4	
Conservative	Malcolm Copson	479	28.7	
Green	Chris Lindsay	88	5.3	
Liberal Democrats	Darrell Butler	77	4.6	
UKIP	Rob Menzies	52	3.1	
TUSC	Mark Davies	32	1.9	
Majority				
Turnout		1672	27.46	

=== St Peter's Parish ===
St Peter's Parish
Party	Candidate	Votes	%	±%
Conservative	Mike Johnson	1,009	63.9	
Labour	Bob Southern	300	19.0	
Green	Nicky Williams	231	14.6	
UKIP	Lisa Barras	40	2.5	
Majority				
Turnout		1585	35.11	

=== Warndon ===
Warndon
Party	Candidate	Votes	%	±%
Labour	Jo Hodges	507	57.0	
Labour	Ceri Stalker	454	51.1	
Conservative	Pam Clayton	213	24.0	
Conservative	Francis Lankester	168	18.9	
Green	Peter Nielsen	114	12.8	
UKIP	Owen Cleary	112	12.6	
Green	Alison Morgan	58	6.5	
UKIP	Chris Roberts	37	4.2	
Majority				
Turnout		889	22.66	

=== Warndon Parish North ===
Warndon Parish North
Party	Candidate	Votes	%	±%
Conservative	Stephen Hodgson	704	45.2	
Labour	Andy Graham	562	36.1	
Green	Andrew Cross	196	12.6	
Liberal Democrats	Sarah Murray	55	3.5	
UKIP	Paul Boyes	27	1.7	
Libertarian	James Goad	14	0.9	
Majority				
Turnout		1563	38.46	

=== Warndon Parish South ===
Warndon Parish South
Party	Candidate	Votes	%	±%
Conservative	Andy Roberts	820	57.6	
Labour	Ella Young	406	28.5	
Green	Stephen Brohan	82	5.8	
Liberal Democrats	Steve Mather	81	5.7	
UKIP	Nicholas Jordan	35	2.5	
Majority				
Turnout		1427	31.38	

== By-Elections held since 2018 ==
=== Claines ===
Claines - 8th August 2019
Party	Candidate	Votes	%	±%
Liberal Democrats	Mel Allcott	1,307	47.6	
Conservative	Juliet Benham	1,251	45.6	
Green	Stephen Dent	125	4.6	
Labour	Saiful Islam	60	2.2	
Majority		56	1.0	N/A
Turnout		2747	42.74	
Liberal Democrats gain from Conservative		Swing		
