= 2012 Worcester City Council election =

Election in Worcester, England

Map of the results

The 2012 Worcester City Council election took place on 3 May 2012 to elect members of Worcester City Council in England. This was on the same day as other 2012 United Kingdom local elections.

After the election, the composition of the council was:

- Conservative 17
- Labour 15
- Liberal Democrats 2
- Green 1

== Ward results ==
The results were:

Arboretum ward
Party	Candidate	Votes	%	±%
Labour	Joy Squires	848	56%	
Conservative	Pamela Clayton	370	25%	
Green	Annie O'Dell	125	8%	
UKIP	Jim Holtom	85	6%	
Liberal Democrats	Oliver Simon Orr	77	5%	
Turnout		1508	31%	
Labour hold		Swing		

Battenhall ward
Party	Candidate	Votes	%	±%
Conservative	Robert Henry Rowden	656	48%	
Labour	Gaynor Anne Pritchard	444	32%	
Green	Linda Jackson	155	11%	
Liberal Democrats	Antony Stuart McIver	119	9%	
Turnout		1380	33%	
Conservative hold		Swing		

Bedwardine ward
Party	Candidate	Votes	%	±%
Conservative	Derek William Prodger	969	52%	
Labour	Matthew Charles Reynolds	597	32%	
Green	Russell O'Dell	203	11%	
TUSC	Peter McNally	94	5%	
Turnout		1869	29%	
Conservative hold		Swing		

Cathedral ward
Party	Candidate	Votes	%	±%
Labour	Lynn Denham	1,057	43%	
Conservative	Francis David Lankester	997	41%	
Green	Stephen Louis	225	9%	
UKIP	Lawson Alec Cartwright	152	6%	
Turnout		2436	31%	
Labour gain from Conservative		Swing		

Claines ward
Party	Candidate	Votes	%	±%
Conservative	Mike Whitehouse	1,182	44%	
Liberal Democrats	Sue Askin	1117	42%	
Green	Peter Robinson	374	14%	
Turnout		2690	17%	
Conservative gain from Liberal Democrats		Swing		

Gorse Hill ward
Party	Candidate	Votes	%	±%
Labour	Roger Edward Berry	673	72%	
Conservative	Simon Parker Harrison	146	16%	
Green	Justin Kirby	116	12%	
Turnout		939	25%	
Labour hold		Swing		

Nunnery ward
Party	Candidate	Votes	%	±%
Labour	Richard Spencer Boorn	1,011	54%	
Conservative	Neil Christopher Monkhouse	554	29%	
Green	Matthew Jenkins	168	9%	
BNP	Carl Martin Mason	150	8%	
Turnout		1889	31%	
Labour gain from Independent		Swing		

Rainbow Hill ward
Party	Candidate	Votes	%	±%
Labour	Adrian Stewart Gregson	552	60%	
Conservative	Edward Peter Charles Turner	169	18%	
UKIP	Carl Henry Humphries	115	13%	
Green	Suzanne Ford	76	8%	
Turnout		918	23%	
Labour hold		Swing		

St Clement ward
Party	Candidate	Votes	%	±%
Conservative	Simon Eon Geraghty	738	45%	
Labour	Richard Gwynfryn Morris	547	33%	
UKIP	James Alexander Goad	155	9%	
Independent	Peter Nielsen	85	5%	
Liberal Democrats	Barry MacGabhann	72	4%	
Green	Stephen Brohan	58	4%	
Turnout		1656	34%	
Conservative hold		Swing		

St John ward
Party	Candidate	Votes	%	±%
Labour	Christine Mary Cawthorne	933	57%	
Conservative	Neill Mark Bucktin	433	27%	
Green	Olaf Twiehaus	151	9%	
TUSC	Mark Patrick Davies	102	6%	
Turnout		1626	28%	
Labour gain from Independent		Swing		

St Stephen ward
Party	Candidate	Votes	%	±%
Green	Neil Laurenson	720	50%	
Conservative	Keith Burton	442	30%	
Labour	Matthew Karl Willis	236	16%	
Liberal Democrats	Melanie Jane Allcott	52	4%	
Turnout		1450	35%	
Green gain from Conservative		Swing		

Warndon ward
Party	Candidate	Votes	%	±%
Labour	Alan Thomas Amos	717	75%	
Conservative	Godfrey Benson	151	16%	
Green	Barbara Mitra	86	9%	
Turnout		960	23%	
Labour hold		Swing		
