= 2000 Worcester City Council election =

2000 UK local government election

The 2000 Worcester City Council election took place on 4 May 2000 to elect members of Worcester City Council in Worcestershire, England. One third of the council was up for election and the Labour Party lost overall control of the council to no overall control.

After the election, the composition of the council was:

- Conservative 16
- Labour 15
- Independent 4
- Liberal Democrat 1

== Background ==
Before the election, Labour held 20 seats as against 11 for the Conservatives, 3 independents and 2 Liberal Democrats. 12 seats were up for election with Labour defending 7 as against 3 for the Conservatives.

== Election result ==
The results saw the Labour Party lose their majority on the council, after losing 4 seats to the Conservatives and 1 to the independents. They also failed to regain St John ward where Margaret Layland held the seat as an independent by 31 votes. She had been elected for Labour in 1996 before leaving the party in 1998.

The results meant that the Conservatives became the largest party on the council for the first time since 1979.

Worcester local election result 2000
Party	Seats	Gains	Losses	Net gain/loss	Seats %	Votes %	Votes	+/−
Conservative	8			+5	66.7			
Labour	2			-5	16.7			
Independent	2			+1	16.7			
Liberal Democrats	0			-1	0			
