= 2021 Worcester City Council election =

2021 UK local government election

Map showing the results of the 2021 Worcester City Council election

The 2021 Worcester City Council election took place on 6 May 2021 to elect councillors to Worcester City Council in England.

== Results summary ==
2021 Worcester City Council election
Party	This election			Full council			This election		
Party	Seats	Net	Seats %	Other	Total	Total %	Votes	Votes %	+/−
Conservative	5	▲2	41.7	13	18	51.4	9,189	39.2	+2.3
Labour	3	▼4	25.0	8	11	31.4	6,530	27.8	+1.7
Green	3	▲1	25.0	1	4	11.4	5,289	22.6	+3.8
Liberal Democrats	1	▲1	8.3	1	2	5.7	2,129	9.1	-0.2
Reform UK	0	Steady	0.0	0	0	0.0	150	0.6	New
TUSC	0	Steady	0.0	0	0	0.0	58	0.2	New
British Resistance	0	Steady	0.0	0	0	0.0	28	0.1	±0.0

== Ward results ==
=== Arboretum ===
Arboretum
Party	Candidate	Votes	%	±%
Green	Karen Lewing	928	45.5	+20.1
Labour	Joy Squires	696	34.1	−4.3
Conservative	Anja Potze	347	17.0	−5.6
Liberal Democrats	Jon Taylor	69	3.4	−3.9
Majority		232	11.4	
Turnout		2,063	43.5	
Green gain from Labour		Swing	▲12.2	

=== Battenhall ===
Battenhall
Party	Candidate	Votes	%	±%
Green	Louis Stephen	1,285	60.5	+12.2
Conservative	Peter Rodford	652	30.7	−14.9
Labour	Paul Mountain	145	6.8	+2.7
Liberal Democrats	Ken Carpenter	43	2.0	+1.4
Majority		633	29.8	
Turnout		2,138	51.6	
Green hold		Swing	▲13.6	

=== Bedwardine ===
Bedwardine
Party	Candidate	Votes	%	±%
Conservative	Alan Amos	1,417	54.5	+9.2
Labour	Sue Smith	672	25.9	+4.1
Green	Frazer Bufton	234	9.0	−1.2
Liberal Democrats	John Ondreasz	194	7.5	−1.5
Women's Equality	Leisa Taylor	81	3.1	−0.1
Majority		745	28.6	
Turnout		2,612	38.9	
Conservative hold		Swing	▲2.6	

=== Cathedral ===
Cathedral
Party	Candidate	Votes	%	±%
Labour	Lynn Denham	1,251	40.3	+5.3
Conservative	Shafaz Ditta	1,211	39.0	+1.7
Green	Hannah Cooper	374	12.1	−0.6
Liberal Democrats	Mark Fenton	130	4.2	−3.9
Reform UK	Julie Bower	102	3.3	N/A
TUSC	Archie Harrison	34	1.1	N/A
Majority		40	1.3	
Turnout		3,117	36.6	
Labour hold		Swing	▲3.6	

=== Claines ===
Claines
Party	Candidate	Votes	%	±%
Liberal Democrats	Karen Lawrance	1,269	41.8	+2.4
Conservative	Louie Lynch	1,199	39.5	−3.1
Labour	James Linsey	278	9.1	+4.2
Green	Stephen Dent	245	8.1	−0.2
Reform UK	Paul Hickling	48	1.6	N/A
Majority		70	2.3	
Turnout		3,058	47.3	
Liberal Democrats gain from Conservative		Swing	▲2.8	

=== Gorse Hill ===
Gorse Hill
Party	Candidate	Votes	%	±%
Conservative	James Stanley	560	51.5	+8.0
Labour Co-op	Roger Berry	408	37.5	−3.6
Green	Susan Avery	79	7.3	+1.1
Liberal Democrats	Alison Morgan	40	3.7	N/A
Majority		152	14.0	
Turnout		1,105	28.6	
Conservative gain from Labour		Swing	▲5.8	

=== Nunnery ===
Nunnery
Party	Candidate	Votes	%	±%
Conservative	Jim Carver	1,129	50.5	+21.7
Labour	Zoe Cookson	807	36.1	−7.0
Green	Barbara Mitra	214	9.6	−5.7
Liberal Democrats	Clive Fletcher	56	2.5	N/A
British Resistance	Carl Mason	28	1.3	+0.3
Majority		322	14.4	
Turnout		2,247	35.6	
Conservative gain from Labour		Swing	▲14.4	

=== Rainbow Hill ===
Rainbow Hill
Party	Candidate	Votes	%	±%
Labour	Adrian Gregson	551	48.8	−10.6
Conservative	Parveen Akhtar	317	30.2	+7.1
Green	Stephen Brohan	144	13.7	+4.1
Liberal Democrats	Sue Carpenter	52	5.0	+1.6
TUSC	Calvin Fowler	24	2.3	N/A
Majority		234	18.6	
Turnout		1,095	26.5	
Labour hold		Swing	▼8.9	

=== St. Clement ===
St. Clement
Party	Candidate	Votes	%	±%
Conservative	Simon Geraghty	933	55.1	+9.8
Green	Victoria Pingree	423	25.0	+10.4
Labour	Paul Walters	283	16.7	−12.0
Liberal Democrats	Peter Jackson	55	3.2	N/A
Majority		510	30.1	
Turnout		1,705	39.1	
Conservative hold		Swing	▼0.3	

=== St. John ===
St. John
Party	Candidate	Votes	%	±%
Labour	Robyn Norfolk	800	44.8	−12.1
Conservative	Joseph Amos	622	34.9	+17.2
Green	Alaric Stephen	201	11.3	+0.1
Liberal Democrats	Steve Mather	115	6.4	N/A
TUSC	Mark Davies	46	2.6	N/A
Majority		178	9.9	
Turnout		1,808	28.7	
Labour hold		Swing	▼14.7	

=== St. Stephen ===
St. Stephen
Party	Candidate	Votes	%	±%
Green	Neil Laurenson	1,086	61.8	+3.9
Conservative	Sam Ness	433	24.6	−3.1
Labour	Christopher Giles	182	10.4	+4.2
Liberal Democrats	Simon Cottingham	56	3.2	+1.5
Majority		653	37.2	
Turnout		1,768	40.8	
Green hold		Swing	▲3.5	

=== Warndon ===
Warndon
Party	Candidate	Votes	%	±%
Conservative	Owen Cleary	369	43.3	+19.3
Labour	Ceri Stalker	357	41.9	−15.1
Green	Sarah Dukes	76	8.9	−3.9
Liberal Democrats	Sarah Murray	50	5.9	N/A
Majority		12	1.4	
Turnout		857	21.8	
Conservative gain from Labour		Swing	▲17.2	
