= Worcester City Council =

Local authority for the city of Worcester, England

Type
- Type: Non-metropolitan district

Leadership
- Mayor: Tor Pingree, Green since 12 May 2026
- Leader: Lynn Denham, Labour since 14 May 2024
- Managing director: Lloyd Griffiths since 1 April 2026

Structure
- Seats: 35 councillors
- Graph of the party split among 35 seats.
- Political groups: Administration (17) Labour (17) Other parties (18) Green (11) Liberal Democrats (5) Reform (1) Independent (1)
- Length of term: 4 years

Elections
- Last election: 2 May 2024

Meeting place
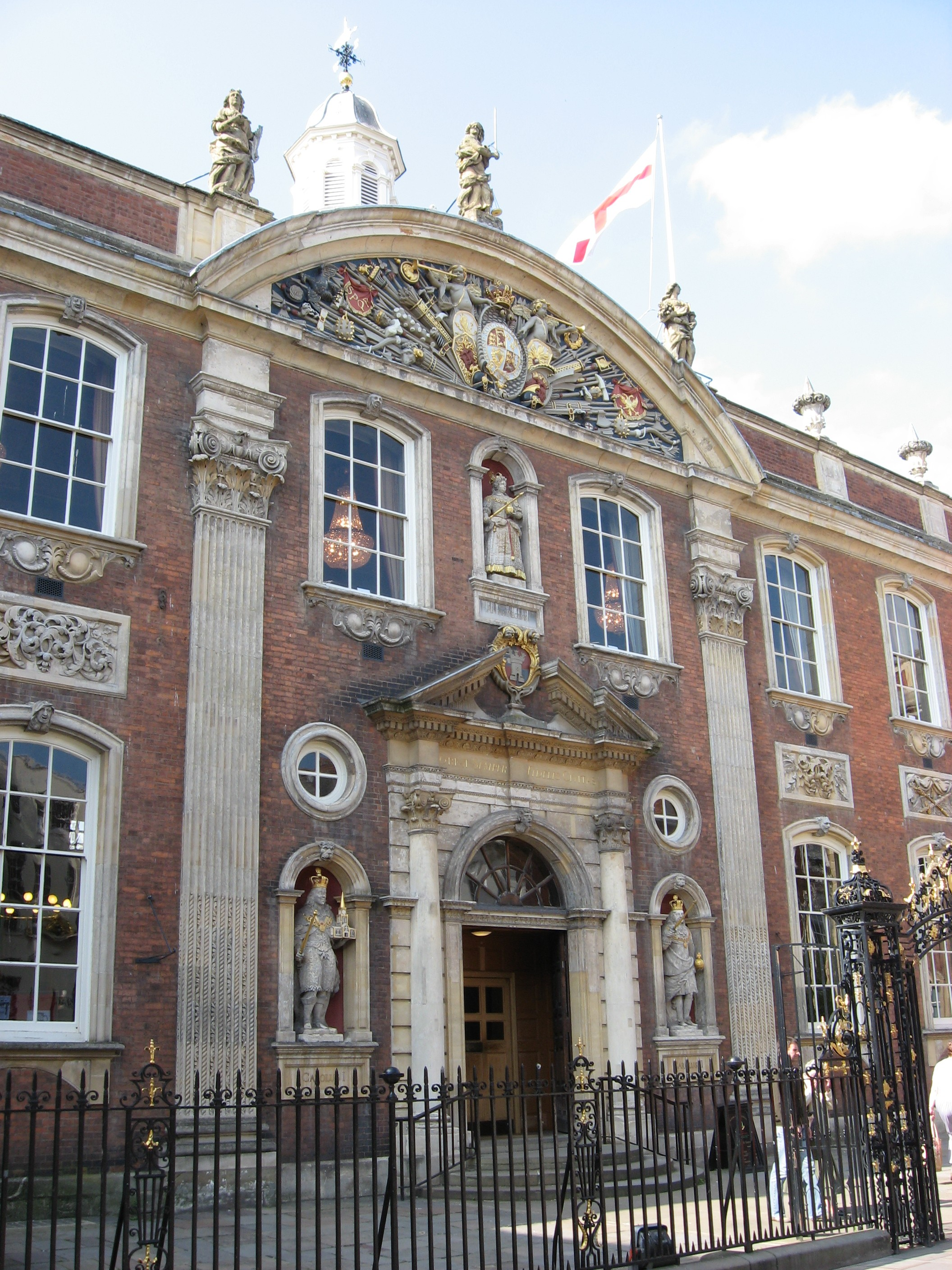
- The Guildhall, High Street, Worcester, WR1 2EY

Website
- www.worcester.gov.uk

Worcester City Council is the local authority for the district of Worcester, in Worcestershire, England. Worcester has had a council since medieval times, which has been reformed on numerous occasions. Since 1974 the council has been a non-metropolitan district council. The council consists of 35 councillors, elected from 15 wards. It is based at Worcester Guildhall. The council has been under no overall control since 2022, and has been run by a Labour minority administration since the 2024 election.

== History ==
Worcester was an ancient borough which had held city status from time immemorial. The city was given the right to appoint its own sheriff in 1621, making it a county corporate, independent from the jurisdiction of the Sheriff of Worcestershire.

The city was reformed to become a municipal borough in 1836 under the Municipal Corporations Act 1835, which standardised how most boroughs operated across the country. It was then governed by a body formally called the "mayor, aldermen and citizens of the city of Worcester", but generally known as the corporation or city council. When elected county councils were established in 1889, Worcester was considered large enough for its existing city council to provide county-level services, and so it was made a county borough, independent from Worcestershire County Council.

In 1974, under the Local Government Act 1972, the city had its territory enlarged, gaining the parishes of Warndon and St Peter the Great County and it became a non-metropolitan district, with Hereford and Worcester County Council providing county-level services. Worcester retained its borough status, allowing the chair of the council to take the title of mayor, whilst its city status was re-conferred on the enlarged district, allowing the council to take the name Worcester City Council. Hereford and Worcester was abolished in 1998, since when a re-established Worcestershire County Council has been the upper-tier authority for Worcester.

== Political control ==
The council has been under no overall control since 2022. Following the 2024 election, Labour had most seats and formed a minority administration.

Political control of the council since the 1974 reforms has been as follows:

Party in control	Years
No overall control	1974–1976
Conservative	1976–1980
Labour	1980–1983
No overall control	1983–1986
Labour	1986–2000
No overall control	2000–2003
Conservative	2003–2007
No overall control	2007–2011
Conservative	2011–2012
No overall control	2012–2015
Conservative	2015–2016
No overall control	2016–2021
Conservative	2021–2022
No overall control	2022–present

=== Leadership ===
The role of Mayor of Worcester is largely ceremonial, with political leadership instead provided by the leader of the council. The leaders since 2002 have been:

Councillor	Party	From	To	Notes
Margaret Wills	Labour	May 1998	May 1999	
Stephen Inman	Conservative	2002	May 2006	
Simon Geraghty	Conservative	May 2006	14 May 2013	
Adrian Gregson	Labour	14 May 2013	3 Jun 2014	
Simon Geraghty	Conservative	3 Jun 2014	5 Feb 2016	
Marc Bayliss	Conservative	23 Feb 2016	17 May 2016	
Adrian Gregson	Labour	17 May 2016	27 Mar 2018	
Marc Bayliss	Conservative	27 Mar 2018	29 Nov 2022	(Note: Nominally "joint leader" after 17 May 2022, with provision made for Labour as second largest party to appoint another joint leader, but they chose not to do so.)
Chris Mitchell	Conservative	29 Nov 2022	May 2023	
Lynn Denham	Labour	16 May 2023	May 2024	Joint leaders
Marjory Bisset	Green	16 May 2023	May 2024	Joint leaders
Lynn Denham	Labour	14 May 2024		

=== Composition ===
Following the 2024 election, and subsequent changes of allegiance up to August 2026, the composition of the council was as follows:

Party	Seats
Labour	17
Green	11
Liberal Democrats	5
Reform	1
Independent	1
Total	35

== Elections ==
Since the last boundary changes in 2024 the council has comprised 35 councillors representing 16 wards, with each ward electing two or three councillors. Elections are held every four years.

== Premises ==
The city council is based at Worcester Guildhall on the High Street in the city centre. The current guildhall was built in 1723 on a site which had been occupied by a guildhall since about 1227.
