= Smart Museum of Art =

Art museum in Chicago, Illinois

Coordinates: 41.7935°N 87.6002°W

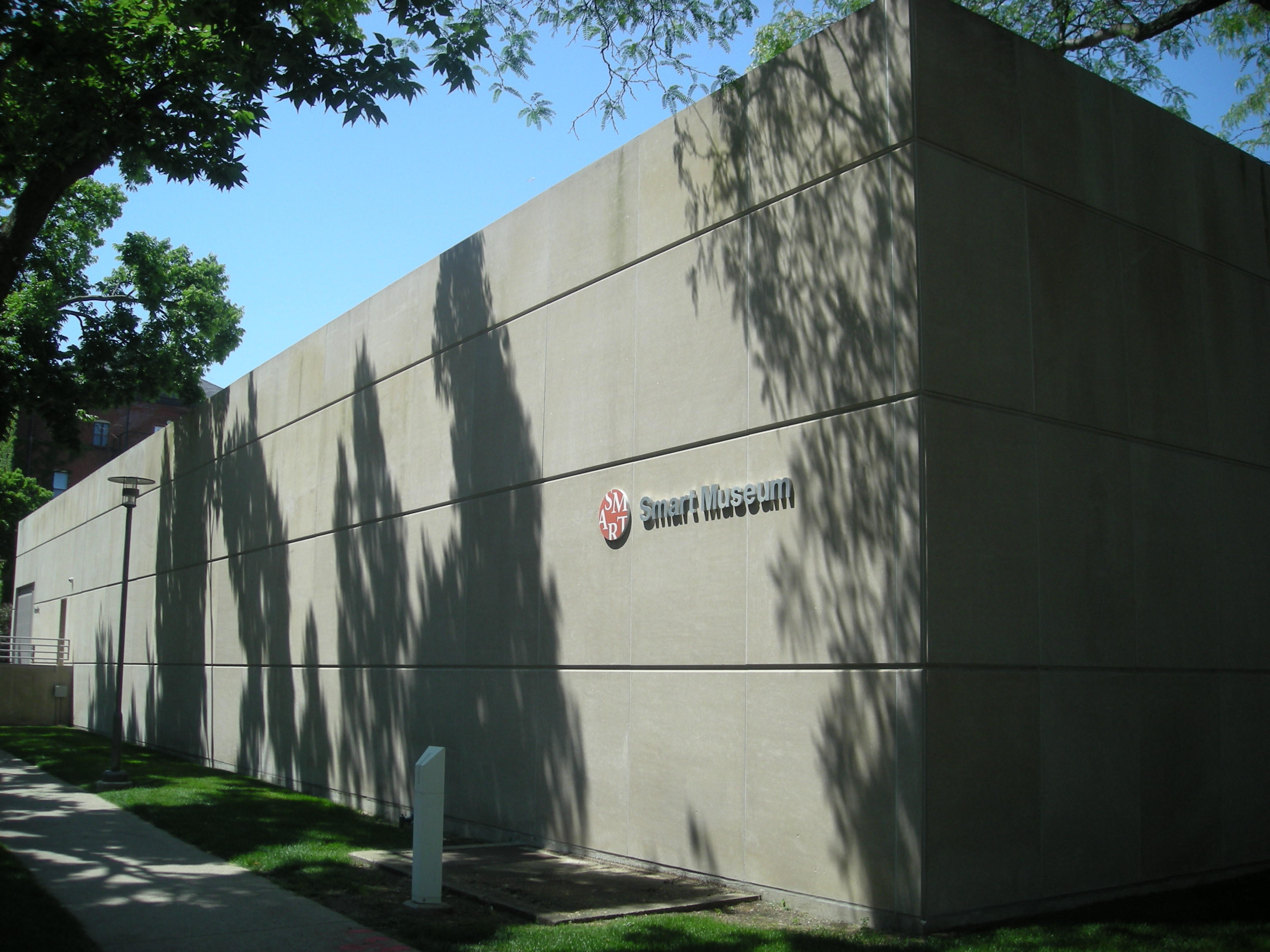
- Former name: Smart Gallery
- Established: 1974
- Location: 5550 S Greenwood Avenue, Chicago, Illinois 60637; United States
- Type: Art museum
- Accreditation: American Alliance of Museums
- Collection size: 17,000+
- Director: Vanja Malloy
- Architect: Edward Larrabee Barnes
- Owner: The University of Chicago
- Website: smartmuseum.uchicago.edu

The David and Alfred Smart Museum of Art is an art museum located on the campus of the University of Chicago in Chicago, Illinois. The permanent collection has over 17,000 objects. Admission is free and open to the public.

The Smart Museum and the adjacent Cochrane-Woods Art Center were designed by the architect Edward Larrabee Barnes.

== History ==
The University of Chicago began seriously planning to build an art museum and establish a permanent art collection in the 1960s (the Renaissance Society was founded in 1915, but does not collect art).

The founding gift came from the Smart Family Foundation in 1967 and construction began in 1971. The museum was named after David A. Smart (1892–1952) and his brother Alfred Smart (1895–1951), the Chicago-based publishers of Esquire, Coronet, and, with Teriade, Verve, as well as the founders of Coronet Films. David Smart was an art collector and owned paintings by Picasso, Renoir, and Chagall. However, the founding gift was of Esquire stock and did not include any works from his personal collection. Instead, the collection was initially assembled from a variety of sources, including works of art in various university departments and gifts from foundations and individual donors.

The Smart's founding director was the art historian and professor Edward A. Maser, and the museum was originally associated with the university's department of art history. In 1983, the museum became a separate unit of the university devoted to serving the entire community, including educational outreach activities in local public schools. In its early years it was known as the Smart Gallery but was renamed the David and Alfred Smart Museum of Art in 1990 to reflect the expanded mission.

== Collection ==
There are over 17,000 objects in the Smart Museum's collection, which are often used in exhibitions and for courses taught at the University of Chicago.

=== Modern art ===
Jean Metzinger, 1914–15, Soldat jouant aux échecs (Soldier at a Game of Chess), oil on canvas

The museum's modern art collection features paintings by Paul Delvaux, Arthur Dove, Childe Hassam, Walt Kuhn, Norman Lewis, Roberto Matta, Joan Mitchell, Jean Metzinger, Diego Rivera, and Mark Rothko, while the Joel Starrels Jr. Memorial Collection includes sculpture by Jean Arp, Edgar Degas, Henry Moore, Jacques Lipchitz, and Auguste Rodin.

One of the most notable items in the collection is the original dining room furniture designed by Frank Lloyd Wright for the Robie House. Most of the original Robie House furniture as well as a few window casings were transferred into the museum collection before it opened in 1974. At that time, the Robie House was still being used as offices for the University of Chicago. The first abstract expressionism work in the collection and one of the first donations to the museum was Untitled (1961) by Mitchell in 1968.

=== Asian art ===
The Asian collection includes literati scroll paintings from China, Japan, and Korea, Buddhist sculpture, ceramics, and ukiyo-e prints. The museum also has a large contemporary Chinese photography collection.

=== European art ===
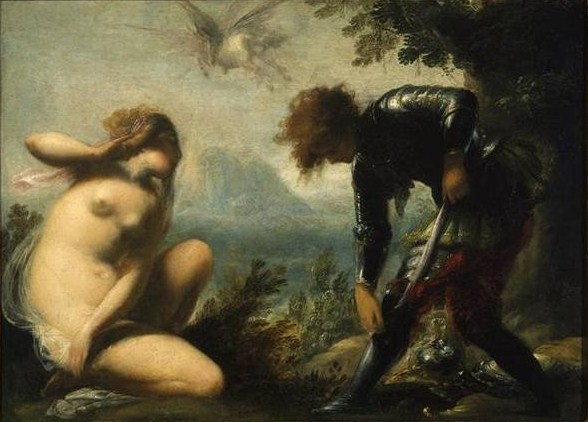
Cecco Bravo, Angelica y Ruggiero, 1660

The European collection focuses on art created before 1900. Twenty-one works from the Kress Collection were donated to the Smart when it opened, including paintings by Cecco Bravo, Luca Cambiaso, Donato Creti, Pordenone, Girolamo da Santa Croce, Jan Steen, and Paolo Veronese.

Other notable works include Goya's The Disasters of War and paintings by Gustave Caillebotte, Louis Dupré, and Jean-Baptiste Regnault.

=== Contemporary art ===
The contemporary collection includes works by John Chamberlain, Antony Gormley, Robert Irwin, Sylvia Sleigh, Andy Warhol, and Claire Zeisler. The museum has a notable collection of Chicago artists, with concentrations of works by the Chicago Imagists, the Monster Roster, and self-taught artists like Henry Darger and Lee Godie.

The collection also includes more recent works by Dawoud Bey, Nick Cave, Theaster Gates, Richard Hunt, Laura Letinsky, Kerry James Marshall, Dan Peterman, and Tony Tasset.

The museum maintains an archive of artwork, sketchbooks, letters, tools, original woodblocks, and other personal material related to the life and work of H. C. Westermann. Much of it was given to the Smart by Westermann's wife, Joanna Beall Westermann, and sister, Martha Renner.

== Architecture ==
The Smart Museum and the adjacent Cochrane-Woods Art Center, which houses classrooms and offices for the University of Chicago's department of art history, were designed by the Chicago-born architect Edward Larrabee Barnes.

The unadorned modernist buildings are linked by covered walkways and face a common outdoor sculpture garden. The buildings are clad in Indiana limestone. They "seem simple but the design is sophisticated" and relate to the gothic architecture and quadrangles found elsewhere on campus.

The lobby of the museum features a vaulted ceiling with a north facing clerestory window. A renovation in 1999 reconfigured and expanded the public gallery spaces within the building's existing footprint.

At the 1971 groundbreaking for the building, Edward H. Levi, the president of the University of Chicago, noted that the design was meant "to display rather than to distract from the works exhibited, and to enhance communication among the scholars" inside. Levi also noted that the project was originally intended to be much larger. Barnes had designed never-realized plans for music, theater, and library facilities extending to the north.

== Operations ==
The Smart Museum is wholly part of the University of Chicago. Its exhibitions and operations are funded through a variety of university, foundation, and individual contributions. It has a board of governors, a membership program, and faculty and student advisory committees.

The museum is open to the public. There is no general admission fee or special charge for exhibitions. It is accredited by the American Alliance of Museums.
