= I Confess (magazine) =

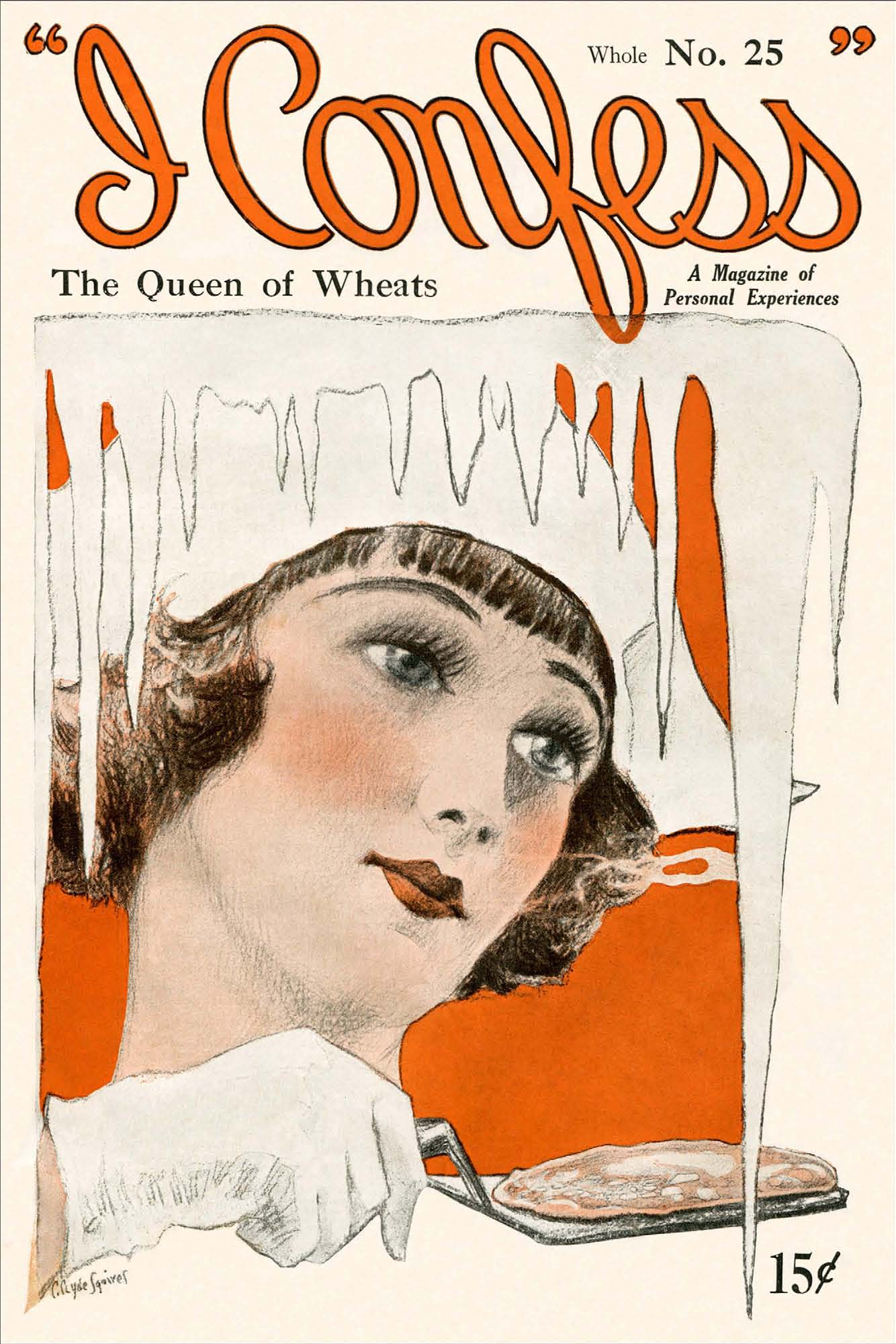
- Cover of the January 12, 1923, issue
- Editor: Elizabeth Sharp
- Frequency: Bi-Weekly
- Publisher: Dell Publishing
- Founded: 1922
- Final issue: 1932
- Country: United States
- Based in: New York City
- Language: English

I Confess was an American biweekly pulp magazine aimed at young women readers that was published between 1922 and 1932 by Dell Publishing. The magazine contained stories that were marketed as being true first-person accounts of mostly middle-class women’s lives and scandals told in a confessional style, which was different from many other pulp magazines which were mainly marketed as cheap fictional magazines. It was the first magazine and title ever published by Dell, and its popularity helped launch over 700 magazine titles, making Dell Publishing the successful publishing house that it remains today.

== Launch of Dell Publishing ==
George T. Delacorte, Jr. founded Dell Publishing in 1921 after many years of working in the magazine publishing business, his last position being that of Advertising Director for Snappy Stories. He started out in one room in the Masonic Temple Building on West 23rd Street in New York, with only himself and two employees. I Confess, introduced as a bi-weekly magazine (on newsstands every other Friday) in 1922, was their first title, and it is considered one of the many imitation ‘Girlie Pulps’ launched due to the success of Snappy Stories (1912-1933) and was inspired by Bernarr McFadden’s magazine True Story, considered the first confessional magazine, which started in 1919 and is still published monthly. The format of Snappy Stories which was the standard for the ‘Girlie Pulp’ genre included stories of scandals and sex, and was meant to attract a mostly female readership due to the racy and intriguing pin-up style art found on the cover.

I Confess was edited by Elizabeth Sharp, who influenced the tone of the magazine and chose which "true life submissions" were "clean" enough to be printed in the magazine. Because Delacorte "aimed the Dell magazines at the lower middle class audiences rather than at the upper middle-class readers of McCall’s and Ladies Home Journal", I Confess cost only ten cents a copy at first publication, although one year after its first issue, in 1923, the price rose to fifteen cents each ($3.00 for a yearly subscription). The price of I Confess was relatively inexpensive when compared to its inspiration and competitor, True Story, which was 25 cents per copy in 1921. Dell Publishing relied on newsstand sales of its magazines rather than profit from advertisements within its titles, and so its inexpensive price and mass appeal ensured that I Confess achieved success at the newsstand. Additionally, Dell Publishing numbered the covers of I Confess, like all of its magazines, instead of printing the dates, as it was easier to re-sell unsold copies if a cover date did not advertise it as an old issue. Dell Publishing "first put them on sale east of the Rocky Mountains and south of Canada. If an issue did not sell, [Delacorte] just trimmed the edges of the unsold copies and attempted to re-sell them, this time west of the Rocky Mountains and in Canada." Circulation varied quite a bit from year to year; by 1926 it reached a circulation of 160,041, and in 1927 circulation became 144,393 for the year.

== Content ==
I Confess had collections of "true life stories" in each number written in various ways. There were serialized stories with cliff-hangers, stand-alone tales, articles on "celebrity encounters," and interviews, and a recurring expert advice column that encouraged women to write to the "Trouble Doctor" in "Tell Your Troubles to the Trouble Doctor’s Department", where women asked for relationship advice. The magazine also encouraged further participation in addition to asking readers to submit their confessions by hosting numerous prize contests. All stories were given the pretence of being true-to-life stories, written by real women, especially in the beginning of the magazine’s production, when it advertised that all stories were truthfully told. Elizabeth Sharp, editor of I Confess, was interested in only showing sympathetic characters whose stories contained "clean content", with no sexually explicit content. However, although the content may have not been as risqué as other magazines, there were many progressive aspects to this magazine which featured stories for middle- and lower-class women, was about mostly lower-middle-class women, and was edited by a woman. Stories about wives standing up to abusive husbands, women who worked for a living, and women taking on masculine roles (or even disguising as men) were common. Examples of I Confess’s progressive nature were revealed in the advice given in the recurring "Trouble Doctor" section:

Question- I am a girl nineteen years of age. My mother died when I was twelve years old, so I have just been knocked from pillar to post ever since, with no one to care for me. But three years ago I met a wealthy young fellow, four years my senior, and fell in love with him. I am not happy, although he gives me everything a girl could wish for and is very good to me. He has promised to marry me several times, but when the time comes he never mentions it, and seems that I can’t stand it any longer this way. But I don’t want to give him up. So please tell me what to do, for I am so very distressed. – Unhappy.

Answer- Learn how to support yourself. In doing so you will come in contact with other people, and the chances are that in time this man will seem less necessary to you. As it is, it looks as if you are mortgaging your future for the sake of a doubtful present happiness. You are so young that you should have all sorts of possibilities if you work now to make your future what you want. If you can bring yourself to break with this man, it will be for the best. And sometimes a man will marry a girl who comes from a different station of life, if it’s a question of marriage or losing her. That had better be your attitude, anyhow.

The advertisements in I Confess reflected their progressive nature as well; while most were fairly standard for pulp magazines of the era, ranging from ads for psychics, Christmas gifts, and cosmetics, in the January 12, 1923 (No. 25) issue there was an advertisement for Margaret Sanger’s Woman and the New Race which encouraged both men and women to read about their options for birth control. This ad targeted married readers who already had multiple children and encouraged them to purchase a copy to learn more about Margaret Sanger’s progressive views on birth control.

Despite Sharp’s attempts to create a less explicit magazine than other girlie pulps on the market, many readers still considered I Confess to be distasteful. In 1925 during an effort by Postmaster General Harry S. New to crack down on magazines’ content using postal obscenity laws, I Confess was identified as one of the magazines many thought objectionable and some thought it in danger of being banned. Its existence, however, was defended by Oswald Garrison Villard, who stated:

It is better that Love Stories, I Confess, and Art Lovers should run their course than that a permanent censorship should be fastened upon the country, which could so easily be extended to cover opinions and political doctrines in addition to racy stories and suggestive pictures.

== Ghostwriters ==
Despite the claims of I Confess, subtitled "A Magazine of Personal Experiences", that its stories were written by real women about real experiences, evidence indicates that many of the stories were fictional and that Dell Publishing paid male writers to create stories for the publication. Pulp novelist Jack Woodford, in his famous autobiographical novel Trial and Error, confessed to having been hired to write "confessions" for I Confess, in addition to writing for multiple other confessional-style magazines:

I have also written true confession stories for True Confession Stories Magazine, I Confess Magazine, and several other confession story magazines. Of the editor, or past editor of I Confess Magazine I know a peach of a story, and whether or not it is true, it is still a good story, and well illustrates a confession magazine point.

A writer friend of mine who was in New York temporarily, feeding liquor to editors in the hope of getting more acceptances when he went back home (a sound policy), dropped in to see the lady editor of I Confess Magazine. My writer friend is an ingratiating person and so is the lady who then was editor of I Confess Magazine. They got along splendidly from the start, and were chatting enjoyably when an office girl entered to announce that a certain writer (male) who specializes in confession stories had arrived for a consultation with the editor. The editor of I Confess Magazine, according to my writer friend, exclaimed in annoyance and petulance at thus being disturbed:

"Christ! There’s that darned unwed mother come to see me again. I’m sorry; we’ll have to cut our chat short."

This story, presumably about Elizabeth Sharp, the "lady editor", shows how more than one male writer was hired to write fake women’s confessions for I Confess. Additionally, Woodford gives a detailed "how-to" on the stock format of writing articles for confessional magazines.

== Impact ==
While never reaching the same popularity and circulation as its predecessor and inspiration True Story, I Confess did have an impact of its own. It remains a notable example of 1920s women’s confessional writing, and as it targeted lower-middle-class women, it has a large selection of stories that focus on the lives of women from all backgrounds of life. Jack Woodford’s exposé of I Confess (and other confessional magazines of the era) helped Trial and Error to become immensely popular, and his directions on the "formula" for ghostwriting a confessional story inspired many novelists. Furthermore, the success of I Confess as the very first publication by Dell Publishing meant that Delacorte was free to create the Dell Magazines brand, which went on to publish over 700 magazines such as Alfred Hitchcock's Mystery Magazine, Asimov's Science Fiction, and, most notably, Astounding Stories, later renamed Analog Science Fiction and Fact, which is still printed today and is the longest continuously published science fiction magazine.
