= Ken (magazine) =

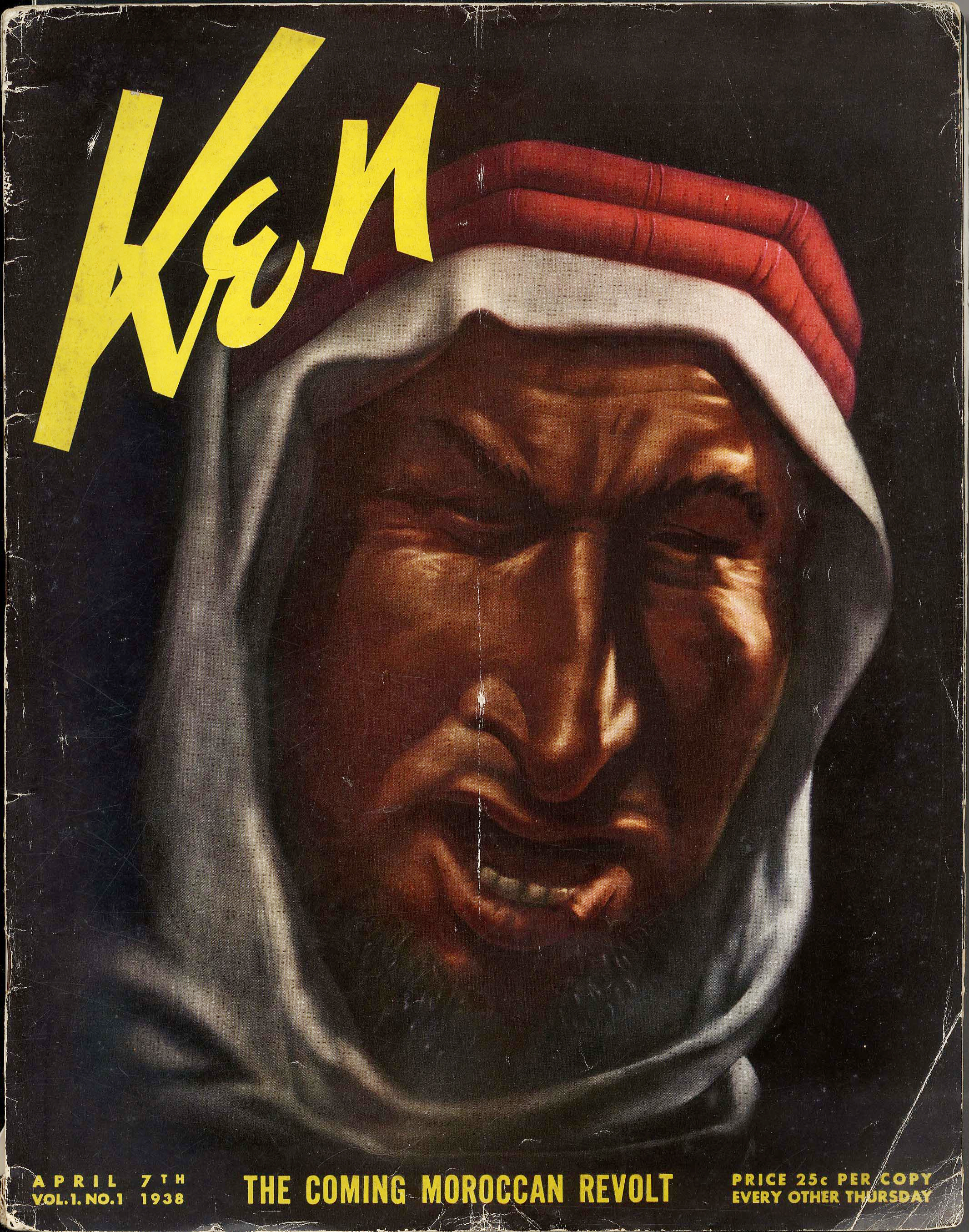
- The cover of the first issue, released on April 7th, 1938.
- Founder: David A. Smart and Arnold Gingrich
- First issue: April 7, 1938; 88 years ago
- Final issue: 1939
- Country: United States

Ken was an American illustrated magazine first issued on April 7, 1938. It was a controversial, political, large format magazine with full page photo spreads, published every two weeks on Thursdays. It contained both articles and stories.

== History and profile ==
Ken was founded in March 1938 by publisher David A. Smart and editor Arnold Gingrich, who earlier had founded Esquire. Initial publication was delayed due to difficulties in assembling an editorial team. Jay Allen was the first editor hired, and he began assembling a staff drawn heavily from the political left. Smart and Gingrich found his work unsatisfactory and quickly fired Allen and most of his new men, replacing him with George Seldes; but because Seldes's left-wing views provoked unrest among potential advertisers, he was soon downgraded, though not fired.

Smart and Gingrich then took more direct editorial control and launched the magazine with contributors including Seldes, Ernest Hemingway, John Spivak, Raymond Gram Swing, Manuel Komroff, critic Burton Rascoe, and sportswriter Herb Graffis. Sam Berman contributed caricatures, and David Low cartoons. Microbe Hunters author Paul de Kruif had been brought on as an editor, but was not able to devote full-time to the project. Seldes's memoir Witness to a Century says that Seldes, de Kruif, and Hemingway were like-minded writers and editors (progressive, republican, anti-fascist) who were invited to co-edit the new magazine. Seldes's view was that Ken failed when its owners abandoned the publication's planned editorial independence to fall in line with advertiser pressure to suppress unflattering investigative reportage such as consumer advocacy and republican critique of fascism, including the Hitler and Mussolini regimes' fight against the republic in the Spanish Civil War. Seldes quotes de Kruif and Hemingway as resigning angrily when this shift happened.

The context of the 1930s as laid out by Seldes was an American press beholden to big business through advertising revenue and the threat of loss thereof, in an era when non-communist progressivism including democratic republicanism and trade unions was being red-baited by big business favorably disposed to fascism and Nazism as supposedly necessary counters to the Bolshevik menace. In short, it was an era when the nominally free press was actually beholden to rich corporate interests whose quest for sufficient anti-communism left them too cozy with right-wing authoritarianism—and who did not tolerate honesty in consumer advocacy because it was bad for sales. This was an era when even reportage on something as fundamental as the link between tobacco and cancer was suppressed by publication owners because it threatened their tobacco advertising revenue, and in which "the Spanish government was red-baited to death."

Some of the politicians with photo layouts in the magazine included Presidents Calvin Coolidge, Grover Cleveland, Warren Harding, Franklin D. Roosevelt, as well as many prominent people in the German politics of the era.

The publication was investigated in 1938 by the House Un-American Activities Committee for being Communist leaning. However, its editor Arnold Gingrich denied that the publication had any political slant. Seldes maintained throughout his life that "To these people [i.e., people like the House Un-American Activities Committee under Dies and later the McCarthyites ] 'one step left of center' meant 'leftist,' and 'leftist' meant 'red,' and 'red' of course meant 'Communist'" (despite that when Seldes was cleared by McCarthy, the press did not report it).

Ken ceased publication in the summer of 1939. Seldes stated that caving in to corporate advertiser pressure did not work, as not many ads were sold even afterward.

== Ernest Hemingway's involvement ==
The first fourteen issues of Ken featured articles by Ernest Hemingway on the Spanish Civil War. In the first issue, of which his article begins on page 36, it is revealed in a caption that Hemingway was initially contracted and announced to be an editor of Ken, but had thus far taken no part in the editing of the magazine, nor in the formation of its policies. The caption goes on to reveal, "If he sees eye to eye with us on Ken, we would like to have him as an editor. If not, he will remain as a contributor until he is fired or quits." The disclaimer was written at Hemingway's insistence, as he felt that Ken's politics might be "liberal-phony" [that is, pseudo-progressive rather than progressive] and did not wish to be too closely associated with it.
