= Henry L. Jackson =

American businessman, editor and journalist

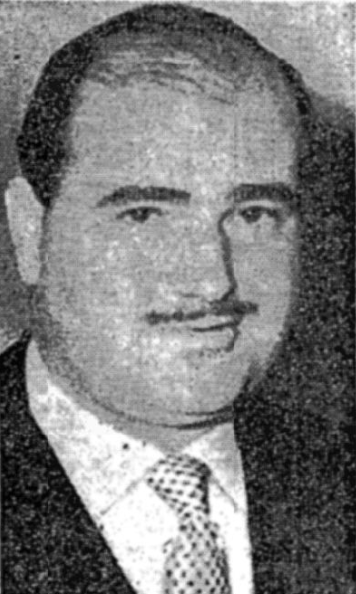
- Born: March 24, 1911; New York City, U.S.
- Died: June 17, 1948 (aged 37); Aristes, Pennsylvania, U.S.
- Occupations: Businessman; Journalist
- Political party: Republican
- Relatives: Henry D. Jackson (grandson)

Henry L. Jackson (March 24, 1911 – June 17, 1948) was an American businessman, editor and journalist and a co-founder of Esquire magazine with David A. Smart and Arnold Gingrich. He was killed in the crash of United Airlines Flight 624 in 1948.

His grandson is American businessman Henry Jackson.

== Career ==
Jackson was an editor at Collier's Weekly in his early years. After meeting David A. Smart and Arnold Gingrich, the three decided to start their own men's fashion magazine, which would include other men's lifestyle journalism. The new magazine, Esquire Magazine, was established in 1932.

== Death ==
In 1948, while on a flight home to New York City, the aircraft that he was on entered an emergency descent after the crew mistook an indicator light and released carbon dioxide extinguishers into the baggage compartment. The crew failed to vent the CO-2 from the plane as they were supposed to do in such a situation. The carbon dioxide then leaked into the main cabin of the plane and incapacitated the crew. The crew then became disoriented and declared an emergency descent, not realizing the problem. The aircraft hit power lines in its emergency descent and burst into flames, killing all 43 people on board.
