= Maurices =

American women's clothing retail chain

Maurices Inc.
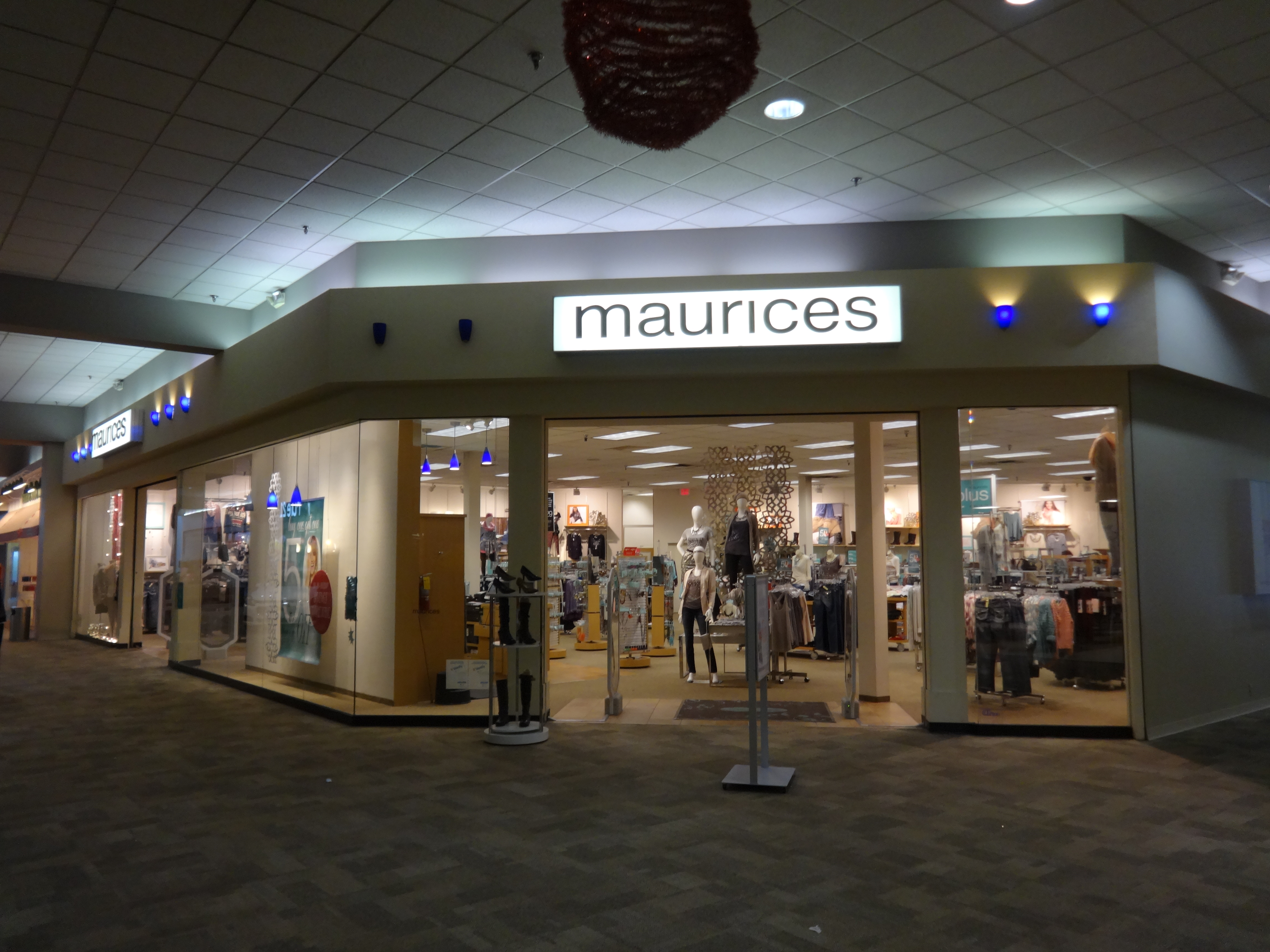
- A Maurices store at Tifton Mall in Tifton, Georgia
- Company type: Subsidiary
- Industry: Retail
- Founded: 1931; 95 years ago
- Founder: E. Maurice Labovitz
- Headquarters: Duluth, Minnesota, U.S.
- Number of locations: 932 (2019)
- Areas served: United States, Puerto Rico, and Canada
- Products: Clothing, footwear, jewelry
- Parent: American Retail Group (1978–2005); Ascena Retail Group (2005–2019); OpCapita (2019-present)
- Website: www.maurices.com

Maurices Inc., stylized as maurıces, is an American women's clothing retail chain based in Duluth, Minnesota. Founded in 1931 in Duluth, the chain comprises more than 1,000 stores in the United States and Canada, primarily located in shopping malls and smaller towns.

The founding Labovitz family sold Maurices to the Brenninkmeijer family's American Retail Group in 1978. Ascena Retail Group acquired it from American Retail Group in 2005.

== History ==
Maurices was founded by Emanuel Morris “E. Maurice” Labovitz (1900-1993), who opened his first store under the name Maurices Dress Shop, 1931 in Duluth. The name was shortened to simply Maurices by the late 1960's.

In 2011, Maurices was rated one of the "Top Ten Best Employers in Retail" by Forbes.com.

In March 2019, Ascena sold a majority stake in Maurices to a U.S. subsidiary of London-based private equity firm OpCapita LLP at a valuation of $300 million. Maurices' leadership team remained in place, with the addition of former GAP CEO Jeff Kirwan as the company's new executive chairman. Ascena will retain a minority stake in the company. In a public statement released after the transaction, OpCapita's CEO Henry Jackson said he would “welcome the continued support of Ascena through their retained stake and the range of services they will provide.”

== Celebrity endorsements ==
In November 2011, Maurices announced a cooperation with celebrity designer Christopher Straub from the reality television show Project Runway season 6, which aired on Lifetime Network. The products are labeled Christopher Straub for maurices and were released nationwide on Friday, November 25, 2011. Straub also designed a plush puppy as part of the collection to benefit the American Cancer Society. This cooperation is a follow-up to the maurices Main Street Model Search which occurred earlier in 2011 with Straub.
