= Fritz Bamberger =

Fritz Bamberger may refer to:

- Fritz Bamberger (painter) (1814–1873), German painter
- Fritz Bamberger (scholar) (1902–1984), German Jewish scholar
