= Roberto Parada =

Roberto Parada may refer to:

- Roberto Parada (painter) (born 1969), freelance illustrator
- Roberto Parada (actor) (1909–1986), Chilean actor, theater director and teacher
