= Fritz Bamberger (scholar) =

- Born: January 7, 1902
- Died: September 21, 1984 (aged 82); Lenox Hill Hospital; New York, New York
- Occupations: Editor, Educator, Scholar
- Known for: Coronet
- Spouse(s): Kate (d. 1952); Maria
- Children: Gabrielle; Michael
- Relatives: Erna Julich (Sister)

Fritz Bamberger (7 January 1902 – 21 September 1984) was a German Jewish Scholar, educator and magazine editor who directed the school system for the education of Jews in pre- World War II, was the editor-in-chief of Coronet starting in 1942, and taught and wrote in the areas of philosophy and intellectual history.

== Life in Germany (1902–1939) ==
Bamberger grew up in Gelsenkirchen, Germany. He studied philosophy and Oriental languages at the University of Berlin, and was awarded a doctorate in 1923 at the age of 21. Bamberger also studied at and graduated from the Hochschule die Wissenschaft des Judentums, where he subsequently taught philosophy from 1933 to 1934. From 1926 to 1933 he was a member of the Forschungsinstitut (research institute) of the Akademie für die Wissenschaft des Judentums (Academy for the Science of Judaism) in Berlin, working on books about Maimonides and Gabirol, and serving as one of the editors of the Akademieausgabe (Academy Edition) of a work on Moses Mendelssohn's collected writings (Moses Mendelssohn: Gesammelte Schriften).

After Hitler's rise in Germany, Bamberger organized a system of schools from kindergarten to college for Jewish students forced from the public schools. In 1934 he was appointed Director of the Bureau of Education for Jews in Berlin and President of the Jewish Teachers College,

== Life in the United States (1939–1984) ==
In January 1939, after having been arrested and briefly held by the Nazi government, Bamberger and his family emigrated to Chicago, Ill. From 1939 to 1942 he taught philosophy and comparative literature at the College of Jewish Studies and the University of Chicago. In 1942 Bamberger left academia for Esquire, Inc., where he subsequently became editor-in-chief of Coronet magazine and thereafter executive director of Esquire magazine. In 1962 Bamberger resigned from Esquire to return to academic life, becoming Assistant to the President and Professor of Intellectual History at the Hebrew Union College – Jewish Institute of Religion (HUC-JIR) in New York. In 1979 he retired. During his life, Bamberger created a major collection of works by and about Spinoza, which is now at the library of the HUC-JIR campus in Jerusalem.

Till his death in 1984 he served as a vice president of the Leo Baeck Institute and vice chairman of the North American Board of the World Union for Progressive Judaism.

== Personal life ==
In 1933, Bamberger married Kate Schwabe, a violinist. They had two children, Michael (1936) and Gabrielle (1938). Kate died in 1952. Bamberger married again: Maria Nussbaum in 1963.

== Selected publications and writings ==
- 1924 – Untersuchungen zur Entstehung der Wertproblems in der Philosophie des 19. Jahrhunderts (The Origin of the Problem of Values in the Philosophy of the 19th Century)
- 1929 – Die geistige Gestalt Moses Mendelssohn (The Spiritual Figure of Moses Mendelssohn)
- 1929–1938 Moses Mendelssohn: Gesammelte Schriften (Collected Writings) (co-editor and contributor)
- 1935 – Das System des Maimonides. Eine Analyse des More Newuchim vom Gottesbegriff aus. Schocken, Berlin 1935 (The System of Maimonides)
- 1937 – Das 9. Schuljahr der Volkshochschulen der Jüdischen Gemeinde zu Berlin. Zielsetzung und Plangestaltung (The 9th School Year of Adult Education Schools of the Jewish Community of Berlin. Goals and Curriculum Plan), with Erna Barschak
- 1941 – Zunz's Conception of History, American Academy for Jewish Research, Jerusalem Proceedings
- 1958 – Leo Baeck, the Man and the Idea, Leo Baeck Institute
- 1960 – Julius Guttman, Philosopher of Judaism, London
- 1962 – Books are the Best Things: An Anthology from Old Hebrew Writings;
- 1970 – The Mind of Nelson Glueck, Cincinnati
- 2003 – Spinoza and Anti-Spinoza Literature: The Printed Literature of Spinozism 1665–1832, Hebrew Union College Print, ISBN 087820914X

Preceded by Arnold Gingrich	Editor in chief of Coronet; 1942–?	Succeeded by ?
