= Coronet (magazine) =

American magazine

- Cover of the August 1965 issue, featuring Elizabeth Montgomery
- Former editors: Arnold Gingrich (1937); Fritz Bamberger (1942)
- Categories: General Interest Digest
- Frequency: Monthly
- Publisher: David A. Smart (1936–1961)
- First issue: November 1936
- Final issue: March 1971
- Company: Esquire, Inc.
- Country: United States
- Based in: Chicago
- Language: English

Coronet was a general interest digest magazine published from October 23, 1936, until at least March 1971 running for 299 issues. Coronet magazine continued publication under some form and ownership through at least September 1976; actress Angie Dickinson was on the cover that month. The magazine was owned by Esquire and published by David A. Smart from 1936 to 1961.

== Typical issue ==
Each issue had a wide variety of articles and features, as well as a condensed book section. Poetry was featured, along with gift advice and star stories. The sister company Coronet Films was promoted in most issues as well. Articles on culture and the arts were mixed with adventure stories and social advice.

== Coronet Films ==
David Smart and the Esquire company also produced Coronet films. Primarily thought of as school films, their titles included "Fun of Being Thoughtful" (1950), "Dating: Do's and Don'ts" (1949), and "Where Does Our Meat Come From?" (1960).

== Editors ==
- Arnold Gingrich (1937)
- Fritz Bamberger (1942)
- John Barkham (1951)
- John Franklin Bardin (1969)

== See also ==
- Ken (magazine)
- Pageant (magazine)
- Reader's Digest
- Sunshine (magazine)
