= Twilight: Where Darkness Begins =

Twilight: Where Darkness Begins is an out of print teen (young adult) horror novel series published between 1982 and 1987. There are 26 stand-alone books in the series written by various authors; the most notable being Bruce Coville, Carl Laymon (a.k.a. Richard Laymon), Imogen Howe, Betsy Haynes, Richie Tankersley Cusick, and Joseph Trainor. The series was published by Dell Publishing and is similar to the Dark Forces teen horror series published by Bantam Books. Each book involves the main character(s) battling supernatural forces of evil.

== Reception ==
Critical reception for the series was initially positive, with the Voice of Youth Advocates saying that the series "promises many hair-raising adventures for occult enthusiasts". The Florida Atlantic University's Fantasy Review noted the series' similarity Bantam's Dark Forces series.

== Books in the series ==
Cover of Twilight #1 Deadly Sleep by Dale Cowan

1. Deadly Sleep by Dale Cowan, 1982. ISBN 0-440-91961-4
2. The Power by Betsy Haynes, 1982. ISBN 0-440-97164-0
3. The Initiation by Robert Brunn, 1982. ISBN 0-440-94047-8
4. Fatal Attraction by Imogen Howe, 1982. ISBN 0-440-92496-0
5. Blink of the Mind by Dorothy Brenner Francis, 1982. ISBN 0-440-90496-X
6. Voices in the Dark by James Haynes, 1982. ISBN 0-440-99317-2
7. Play to Live by Charles Veley, 1982. ISBN 0-440-96950-6
8. Blood Red Roses by Sarah Armstrong, 1982. ISBN 0-440-90314-9
9. Demon Tree by Colin Daniel, 1983. ISBN 0-440-92097-3
10. The Avenging Spirit by E. Stevenson, 1983. ISBN 0-440-90001-8
11. Nightmare Lake by Carl Laymon, 1983. ISBN 0-440-95945-4
12. The Twisted Room by Janet Patton Smith, 1983. ISBN 0-440-98690-7
13. Vicious Circle by Imogen Howe, 1983. ISBN 0-440-99318-0
14. Footprints of the Dead by Jay Callahan, 1983. ISBN 0-440-92531-2
15. Spirits and Spells by Bruce Coville, 1983. ISBN 0-440-98151-4
  Republished in 1996 as part of Bruce Coville's Chamber of Horrors series. ISBN 0-671-53638-9
16. Drawing the Dead by Neil R. Selden, 1983. ISBN 0-440-92141-4
  Cover of Twilight #15 Spirits and Spells by Bruce Coville
17. Storm Child by Susan Netter, 1983. ISBN 0-440-98289-8
18. Watery Grave by Joseph Trainor, 1983. ISBN 0-440-99419-5
19. Dance of Death by Lou Kassem, 1984. ISBN 0-440-91659-3
20. Family Crypt by Joseph Trainor, 1984. ISBN 0-440-92461-8
21. Evil on the Bayou by Richie Tankersley Cusick, 1984. ISBN 0-440-92431-6
22. The Haunted Dollhouse by Susan Blake, 1984. ISBN 0-440-93643-8
23. The Warning by Amanda Byron, 1985. ISBN 0-440-99335-0
24. Amulet of Doom by Bruce Coville, 1985. ISBN 0-440-90119-7
  Republished in 1996 as part of Bruce Coville's Chamber of Horrors series. ISBN 0-671-53637-0
25. A Deadly Rhyme by Gloria Gonzalez, 1986. ISBN 0-440-91866-9
26. Scavenger's Hunt by Arthur Bicknell, 1987. ISBN 0-440-97672-3
