= American Shoeshine =

1975 film

- Directed by: Sparky Greene
- Produced by: Sparky Greene
- Distributed by: Perspective Films
- Release date: 1975
- Running time: 30 minutes
- Country: United States
- Language: English

American Shoeshine is a 1975 American short documentary film directed by Sparky Greene. It covers the history of shoe shining in the United States, interviews current shoe shiner, and describes rag popping, a form of music made with a shoeshine rag.

== Reception ==
In his 2017 Reader article, Black Cinema House honors the art of the shoeshine, Ben Sachs writes, "American Shoeshine largely considers this generation of shiners, who brought a sense of musicality and bonhomie to their work. Greene deftly intercuts jolly interviews with African-American shoe shiners with archival footage of African-Americans picking cotton, conveying in a few images the northward migration of blacks in the early 20th century and the lives that they left behind in the South. The editing of, American Shoeshine is clever, employing juxtapositions like these to relate modern-day experience to historical antecedents. Greene’s use of blues songs on the soundtrack is also smart, creating a sense of historical continuity between the contemporary testimonies and archival footage."

In a review in Jump Cut, Robert L. Pest states that the film fails to consider the racist history of rag popping in the presentation of rag popping as art, writing: "Had Greene chosen to confront, or at least acknowledge, the contradictions of this position, American Shoeshine would have been a different, and perhaps better, film. But as it is, American Shoeshine is still a direct and effective portrait of the history and practice of a unique occupation".

American Shoeshine was nominated for an Academy Award for Best Documentary Short.

== See also ==
- List of American films of 1975
