= Dell Publishing =

American publisher

- Parent company: Random House
- Founded: 1921; 105 years ago
- Founder: George T. Delacorte Jr.
- Defunct: 1976
- Country of origin: United States
- Headquarters location: New York City
- Publication types: Books
- Imprints: Dial, Delacorte, Laurel Leaf, Yearling
- Official website: dellbookpublishing.com

Dell Publishing Company, Inc. is an American publisher of books, magazines and comic books, that was founded in 1921 by George T. Delacorte Jr. with $10,000 (equivalent to $180,504 in 2025), two employees and one magazine title, I Confess, and soon began turning out dozens of pulp magazines, which included penny-a-word detective stories, articles about films, and romance books (or "smoochies" as they were known in the slang of the day).

During the 1920s, 1930s and 1940s, Dell was one of the largest publishers of magazines, including pulp magazines. Their line of humor magazines included 1000 Jokes, launched in 1938. From 1929 to 1974, they published comics under the Dell Comics line, the bulk of which (1938–62) was done in partnership with Western Publishing. In 1943, Dell entered into paperback book publishing with Dell Paperbacks. They also used the book imprints of Dial Press, Delacorte Books, Delacorte Press, Yearling Books, and Laurel Leaf Library.

Dell was acquired by Doubleday in 1976, which was itself acquired by Bertelsmann in 1986. Bertelsmann later consolidated Dell with other imprints into Random House.

== Dell Magazines ==
Dell Magazines is a magazine imprint known for its many puzzle and astrology magazines. It formerly owned Alfred Hitchcock's Mystery Magazine, Ellery Queen's Mystery Magazine, Asimov's Science Fiction, and Analog Science Fiction and Fact until 2025.

The first puzzle magazine Dell published was Dell Crossword Puzzles, in 1931, and since then it has printed magazines containing word searches, math and logic puzzles, and other diversions.

Dell Magazines acquired Alfred Hitchcock's Mystery Magazine, Ellery Queen's Mystery Magazine, Asimov's Science Fiction, and Analog Science Fiction and Fact in 1992 from Davis Publications.

Dell Magazines is also the sponsor of the Astounding Award for Best New Writer, given out by the World Science Fiction Society alongside the Hugo Awards. The award was previously known as the John W. Campbell Award for Best New Writer from its founding in 1973 until 2019, after that year's winner, Jeannette Ng, criticized John W. Campbell during her award acceptance speech.

Dell Magazines was sold in March 1996 to Crosstown Publications, with headquarters in Norwalk, Connecticut. The parent company is now known as Penny Publications, LLC, which also publishes Penny Press puzzle magazines.

=== Former Dell magazines ===
- Alfred Hitchcock's Mystery Magazine - Founded 1956
- Analog Science Fiction and Fact - Founded 1930
- Asimov's Science Fiction - Founded 1977
- Ellery Queen's Mystery Magazine - Founded 1941

=== Defunct Dell magazines ===
- 1000 Jokes (1938–1968)
- Ballyhoo (1931–1939; 1948–1954)
- I Confess (1922–1932)
- Modern Screen (1930–1985)
- Louis L'Amour Western Magazine (1994–1995)
- Zane Grey Western Magazine (1946–1974)

== Paperbacks ==
Dell's earliest venture into paperback publishing began because of its close association with Western Publishing. William Lyles wrote, "Dell needed paper, which Western had in 1942, and because Western by this time needed printing work, which Dell could supply in the form of its new paperback line. So Dell Books was born, created by Delacorte of Dell and Lloyd E. Smith of Western."

Dell began publishing paperbacks in 1942 at a time when mass-market paperbacks were a relatively new idea for the United States market—its principal competitor, Pocket Books, had only been publishing since 1939. An examination of paperback books available at this time shows no consensus on standardization of any feature; each early company was attempting to distinguish itself from its competitors. Lyles commented, "Dell achieved more variety than any of its early competitors. It did so, at first, with an instantly identifiable format of vibrant airbrushed covers for its predominantly genre fiction, varying 'eye-in-keyhole' logos, maps on the back covers, lists of the books' characters, and 'tantalizer-pages'. The design was merchandising genius; it successfully attracted buyers, it sold books."

The first four books did not feature maps on the back cover; this began with Dell #5, Four Frightened Women by George Harmon Coxe. (A later re-issue of Dell #4, The American Gun Mystery by Ellery Queen, added a map.) The map was meant as an aid to the reader, to show the location of the principal activity of the novel. Some were incredibly detailed; others somewhat stylized and abstract. The books were almost immediately known as "mapbacks", and that nomenclature has lasted among collectors to this day. The maps were "delicate and detailed".

The novels in the mapback series were primarily mysteries/detective fiction but ran the gamut from romances (Self-Made Woman by Faith Baldwin, #163) to science fiction (The First Men in the Moon by H. G. Wells, #201), war books (I Was a Nazi Flyer by Gottfried Leske, #21 and Eisenhower Was My Boss by Kay Summersby, #286), many Westerns (Gunsmoke and Trail Dust by Bliss Lomax, #271), joke books (Liberty Laughs, Cavanah & Weir, #38) and even crossword puzzles (Second Dell Book of Crossword Puzzles, ed. Kathleen Rafferty, #278, one of the rarest titles today). There were a few movie tie-in editions (The Harvey Girls by Samuel Hopkins Adams, #130, and Rope as by Alfred Hitchcock, #262) and the occasional attempt at more artistic non-genre fiction (To a God Unknown by John Steinbeck, #407). Novels which are today long forgotten, by largely unknown authors (Death Wears a White Gardenia, by Zelda Popkin, #13) are in the same series as valuable original paperback editions of famous authors (A Man Called Spade, by Dashiell Hammett, #90). "The back cover map was very popular with readers and remains popular with collectors... the Dell 'mapbacks' are among the most well-known vintage paperbacks."

In the early 1950s, as series numbering reached the 400s, Dell began updating the appearance of its books. In 1951, the back cover maps began to be gradually replaced with conventional text and "blurb" covers. Some later, more stylized maps were the product of Milton Glaser and Push Pin Studios. These innovations were brought in by editor-in-chief Frank Taylor. He introduced classics in paperback form under the umbrella imprint "Laurel Editions" which included the Laurel Henry James series and the Laurel Poetry Series, the latter edited by the distinguished poet Richard Wilbur. In the early 1960s the Dell Purse Book series of pocket-sized information books on a wide range of topics was launched.

Dell was also the publisher of the paperback novel series Twilight: Where Darkness Begins between 1982 and 1987.

== Dell Ten Cent Books ==
At about this time, Dell launched two short-lived experiments which are also considered very collectible, Dell First Editions and Dell Ten Cent Books. The Ten Cent Books, 36 in all, were thin, paperback-sized editions containing a single short story told in only 64 pages (advertised as "too short for popular reprint at a higher price"), such as Robert A. Heinlein's Universe (1951).

Dell First Editions included novels by John D. MacDonald, Fredric Brown, Jim Thompson, Elmore Leonard and Charles Williams.

== Comic strip reprints ==
In 1947, Dell published two unnumbered paperbacks based on newspaper comic strips, Blondie and Dagwood in Footlight Folly and Dick Tracy and the Woo Woo Sisters. Both are popular with collectors today.

== Dell today ==
Dell Publishing no longer exists as an independent entity. Dell was acquired by Doubleday in 1976. Doubleday was acquired by Bertelsmann in 1986, who formed Bantam Doubleday Dell as its US subsidiary. Bertelsmann acquired Random House in 1998 and renamed its US business after the acquisition. After the merger, Bantam was merged with Dell Publishing. In 2001, Random House purchased Golden Books' book publishing properties effectively reuniting the remnants of Dell and Western Publishing. Bantam Dell became part of the Random House publishing group in 2008. Ballantine Books was merged with Bantam Dell in 2010. In 2013, Random House merged with Penguin to form Penguin Random House.

Dell Magazines was sold in 1996 to Penny Publications, and it still exists as a major publisher of puzzle magazines, also publishing science fiction, mystery and horoscope magazines.

== Imprints ==
- Abyss Books
- Dial Press
- Delacorte Books (a.k.a. Delacorte Press)
- Delta
- Yearling Books
- Laurel Leaf Library
- Seymour Lawrence
  - Merloyd Lawrence

== Notable publications ==
- Famous Funnies: A Carnival of Comics (1933) – the first American comic book
- The New Century Family Money Book (1993)
