= Yulia Spiridonova =

Russian photographer and artist

Yulia Spiridonova (Russian: Юлия Дмитриевна Спиридонова; born 1986 in Moscow, Soviet Union) is a Russian photographer and contemporary artist. Calvert Journal included her in the list of ten rising stars at the Moscow Biennale for Young Art 2016.

== Education ==
Yulia Spiridonova earned her humanities degree from Moscow State University and attended the post-graduate program at the Massachusetts College of Art and Design.

== Art ==
Yulia Spiridonova has participated in a number of exhibitions in Russia, United States, Germany, and the Netherlands. In 2016 her project "Parallel News" was selected for the Moscow International Biennale for Young Art. Her provocative imagery received a mixed critical response in Russia, where one of her artworks, which depicted a gay couple with physical disabilities having sex, was called by critics an 'autoerotic disorder'.

== Career ==
Yulia Spiridonova works for Esquire in Moscow, Russia. As a contributing photographer she made a series of portraits of notable Russians, including the political artist Petr Pavlensky.
