= Dan Peterman =

American artist

Dan Peterman is an internationally known artist who is recognized for his work with ecologically themed installation art. Additionally, he is employed as associate professor of art at the University of Illinois, Chicago.

== Work ==
Peterman's work is an example of adaptive reuse though he was practicing it long before it had an official title. Peterman takes existing objects and manipulates them to show their original purpose while exposing the possibility for newness. His work explores the "intersection of art and ecology" and he "embraces a wide variety of formal and situational strategies, and employs a range of materials including recycled plastic and metals, as well as organic and post-consumer waste."

Though Peterman usually exhibits his work in museums and at art galleries, he is known for displaying his art for the general public. The most known example is his running table, a 100-foot-long picnic table located in Chicago's Millennium Park. The table "considers issues around consumption and recycling" and is "made from the equivalent of two million recycled milk bottles." Another of Peterman's works, an 80' x 80' dance floor often used by the City of Chicago for summer events, is located just a few blocks away in Grant Park.

== Reviews ==
- Frieze Magazine: "Situated within the contradictions that damn and glorify public space, Peterman’s work takes on a class-crossing potential, in addition to its material ironies, that it could not achieve in a more circumscribed art space."
- Klosterfelde Gallery: "In using human waste for his sculpture work or installed environments he reveals the interrelated social, economic and political effects of our generation of waste."
- Museum of Contemporary Art: "'Environmental' is the lazy way of describing Dan Peterman's work. While his art is about resource recovery-he incorporates recycled materials into his projects-it's also alchemical, sociological, and activist."

== Notable exhibitions ==
- Liechtenstein Art Museum
- Smart Museum of Art
- Baltimore Museum of Art
- Museum of Contemporary Art, Chicago
- Gothenburg Museum of Art
- Abteiberg Museum
- National Museum of Modern Art, Kyoto

== Notable awards ==
- Richard Driehaus Foundation award
- Lewis Comfort Tiffany Foundation award
- UIC University Scholar Award

== Education ==
- B.F.A. University of Wisconsin-Eau Claire
- M.F.A. University of Chicago
