= Henry Jackson (businessman) =

American investor and entrepreneur (born 1964)

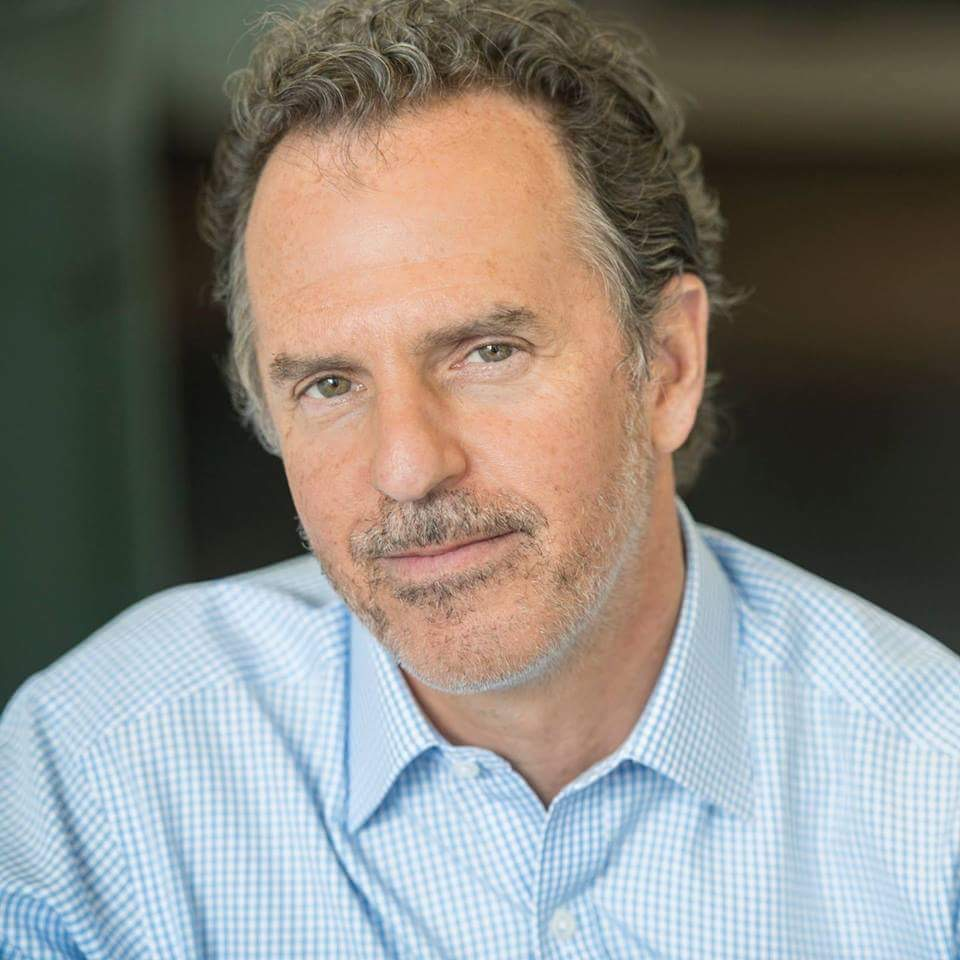
- Born: Henry D. Jackson; 16 December 1964 (age 61); New York City, US
- Education: University of Pennsylvania
- Occupation: Private equity investor
- Title: CEO, OpCapita
- Spouse: Stacey Jackson
- Children: 4
- Relatives: Henry L. Jackson (grandfather)

Henry D. Jackson (born December 16, 1964) is an American investor and entrepreneur, who has been a UK citizen since 2005. He is chief executive of OpCapita LLP, a London-based private equity firm. Jackson founded OpCapita in early 2006 alongside operating partners David Hamid and John von Spreckelsen.

== Early life ==
Jackson graduated summa cum laude from the College of Arts and Sciences and from the Wharton School of the University of Pennsylvania in 1986 where he was awarded membership of Phi Beta Kappa and Beta Gamma Sigma, the national business school honors society. He is the grandson of Henry L. Jackson, a co-founder of Esquire magazine who died in the crash of United Airlines flight 624 in 1948.

== Career ==
In 1995, Jackson was named as one of Crain's New York's 40 Under 40 following his successful advice to the creditors of Macy's in its merger with Federated Department Stores. Jackson was also featured in a chapter of the book "A Not-So-Tender Offer: An Insider’s Look at Mergers and Their Consequences", profiling many of the transactions he advised on as a US investment banker and written by New York Times business reporter Isadore Barmash.

Jackson is considered an "industry maverick" by the industry press for having established a firm with a clearly differentiated strategy of operational transformation. Before setting up OpCapita, he was a Managing Director of Deutsche Bank AG and head of its European Consumer and Retail Group. Prior to this he held partner-level positions at Credit Suisse First Boston (CSFB), Peter J. Solomon Company, and Donaldson, Lufkin & Jenrette (DLJ), during which time he advised companies such as Home Depot, JC Penney, Ralphs Grocery Stores, Perry Drug Stores, Carrefour, Tesco, Prada, Ferrari and New Look on restructurings, financings and M&A.

Jackson is on the board of Invest Europe, a Brussels-based industry association representing Europe's private equity, venture capital and infrastructure firms and their investors, sits on its Mid-Market Platform Council and is chairman of its Turnaround and Operational Improvement Roundtable. He is active in philanthropy in the US and UK and is a member of the executive committee of the Special Projects Committee of Memorial Sloan Kettering Cancer Center in New York, a member of the Council of the Serpentine Galleries in London and a member of the Board of Overseers of the School of Arts and Sciences at the University of Pennsylvania.

== Personal life ==
He is married to singer/songwriter Stacey Jackson, they have three sons and one daughter, and live in Chelsea, London.
