= Reuben Hill =

American sociologist

Reuben Lorenzo Hill Jr. (July 4, 1912 – September 26, 1985) was an American sociologist. He specialized in the sociology of the family. He was the seventh president of the International Sociological Association (1970–1974). He has been called "the founding father of family sociology".

== Biography ==
Hill was born on July 4, 1912, in Utah. In his youth he served as a missionary in Europe for the Church of Jesus Christ of Latter-day Saints. After his mission he was not involved in that Church in any meaningful participatory way. He received his PhD in 1938 from the University of Wisconsin. He later taught at the University of South Dakota (1942–1945), Iowa State University (1945–1949), University of North Carolina (1949–1957) and University of Minnesota (1957–1983). At Minnesota, he held the title of the Regents’ Professor of family sociology from 1973. He was also a visiting professor at the University of Puerto Rico (1953–1954), University of Louvain (1961–1962) and others. He retired in 1983 as an emeritus professor.

Hill died in Norway on September 26, 1985.

== Research and impact ==
Hill specialized in the sociology of the family. He was influenced by works of Ernest W. Burgess, Evelyn Duvall, Howard Becker, Clifford Kirkpatrick, and Willard W. Waller. Through his career he authored 20 books and over 150 articles and gave lectures in over 40 countries. Bert N. Adams described him as "one of the leading scholars in the field of marriage and the family". David H. Olson and Pauline Boss went even further, noting that Hill "was considered the founding father of family sociology". He was one of the first sociologists in the United States specializing in studying family and marriage.

John Mogey noted that one of his early books, When you marry (1945) a textbook on sociology of family, "set a national standard for functional courses in family life education" for many years.

The Reuben Hill Research Award, given annually in his name by National Council on Family Relations (NCFR), was established in 1980 and is awarded for the best research or theory paper in the field of family sociology.

Wesley R. Burr described Hill's contribution as follows:

[D]eveloping a model to study family crises, conducting theory-based field experiments, organising the first bibliographic storage system in the field, developing the methodology to study three generations of families simultaneously, initiating graduate traineeships in the family field, helping to develop the family development conceptual framework, developing methods to improve theory, dramatically improving theory, and helping to establish the Theory and Method workshops that are held in conjunction with the annual meetings of the National Council on Family Relations.

Olson and Boss mention that Hill's "ABC-X model describing family stress [presented in 1958] has had an immense impact on the field".

== Awards ==
He received, among others, the first Ernest W. Burgess Award given by the National Council on Family Relations (NCFR).

== See also ==
- Dating Do's and Don'ts
