= Coronet Films =

Film company specializing in educational films

- Founded: 1934; 92 years ago
- Defunct: 1997; 29 years ago
- Fate: Closed
- Owner: Phoenix Learning Group, Inc.

Coronet Films (also known as Coronet Instructional Media Inc.) was an American producer and distributor of documentary shorts shown in public schools, mostly in the 16mm format, from the 1940s through the 1980s (when the videocassette recorder replaced the motion picture projector as the key audio-visual aid). The company, whose library is owned and distributed by the Phoenix Learning Group, Inc., covered a wide range of subjects in zoology, science, geography, history and math, but is mostly remembered today for its post-World War II social-guidance films featuring topics such as dating, family life, courtesy and citizenship.

== Overview ==
Act Your Age (1949), an example of Coronet Films

David A. Smart established the company with his brothers Alfred and John in 1934, but the first titles registered for copyright date from 1941 (beginning with Aptitudes and Occupations). Over time, a studio was set up in Glenview, Illinois. Smart was the publisher of Esquire and Coronet magazines, and the film company was named for the latter. The film company outlived the magazine, which ceased publication in 1976.

In addition to producing military instructional films during World War II, Coronet found success in its early years with its full-color films about common birds such as the ruby-throated hummingbird (a 1942 release), many of which were filmed by Olin Sewall Pettingill Jr. and Dr. Arthur A. Allen. One of the company's hallmarks was that many of its titles were shot in color Kodachrome a few years ahead of competing classroom-film companies. Production costs were controlled by selling both color and black-and-white prints and charging a much lower fee for the latter. As many school educators economized, fewer color prints are viewable today than are those in black and white.

After David Smart’s death in 1952, his brother John and Jack Abraham took over. The quantity of Coronet’s output had surpassed that of the classroom-film industry’s leader Encyclopædia Britannica Films (initially ERPI Classroom Films), with an 11-minute or longer film completed nearly every week. While its main rival strove for more cinematic films, the narration included in the 1950s and 1960s Coronet films was often of a dry and didactic tone. However, Coronet produced some well-made travelogues boasting good cinematography in addition to an annual quota of animal-related films. Starting in 1957, a Special Productions unit headed by Bob Kohl and Tom Riha added some more ambitious and prestigious independent productions to Coronet's more economically made catalog titles.

The 1970s were a creative period for the company, despite the fact that 16mm educational films were gradually replaced by video cassettes and computers as key audio-visual classroom tools a decade later. After Hal Kopel replaced Jack Abraham as general manager (around 1972), the look and style of the films received an upgrade and film credits included directors and creative personnel; most earlier films only credited educational consultants. This change was made in response to ongoing criticism that the Coronet films were too "stodgy and unimaginative." Many earlier titles were revised to reflect the higher production standards and changing audience expectations of the period.

By the early 1980s, Coronet was becoming more of a distributor of other companies' films than a producer of its own. Sheldon Sachs became vice president in 1979 and headed a Perspective Films division to increase Coronet's distribution of outside productions, making theatrical award winners like Sparky Greene's American Shoeshine available for classroom viewing. In 1981, Coronet acquired Centron Corporation.

Shortly after merging with MTI films in 1984, Coronet and its acquisitions were taken over by Gulf and Western Industries, but Kohl bought back Centron as a separate entity to run himself. Simon & Schuster, part of the conglomerate, moved the reduced filming facilities to New Jersey a decade later. In May 1997, Phoenix Learning Group took over the distribution rights to the Coronet catalog.

== Personal-guidance films ==
Beginning with Shy Guy (1947), featuring an early appearance of a 19-year-old Dick York (later of Bewitched fame), the company gained considerable renewed attention for a cluster of "personal guidance" films created to instructing students in social matters. Typical titles include Are You Popular?, Everyday Courtesy and What to Do on a Date, along with the Korean War-period series Are You Ready for the Service?

Ted Peshak was a key director, although screen credits were often reserved only for psychology consultants. Many were filmed in color, but most extant copies are in black and white, as schools most often opted for the cheaper format. Most were made prior to David Smart’s death in 1952, but a few more were added as late as the 1970s, such as Beginning Responsibility: A Lunchroom Goes Bananas.

As most of the films were produced early in the postwar film boom, they were typical of the quality, production values and content of media of the period, and many considered them unintentionally humorous in the context of the post mid-1960s sexual revolution.

After the earliest films entered the public domain (a large percentage of the library is still privately owned), some of the films were recognized as kitsch, especially after a few became shorts for the television shows Pee-wee's Playhouse and Mystery Science Theater 3000 (MST3K), which mocked the films' production values and underlying messages. Shorts featured on MST3K include Are You Ready for Marriage? and What to Do on a Date. Many of Coronet's other films were later lampooned by Rifftrax, a company created by former MST3K cast member Michael J. Nelson.

In 1978, Coronet participated in a compilation spoof titled The Great American Student. Made by veteran director Mel Waskin and editor Bob Gronowski and lifting key scenes from the older films, it was distributed as would be any other educational film of the period as a joke on unsuspecting libraries. According to historian Geoff Alexander, it "is unique in the genre for its self-deprecating humor, and is a historical masterpiece."

== Selected filmography ==
The following is a sample of prominent titles.

- Act Your Age (1949)
- "The African Continent" (1963)
- Alaska: A Modern Frontier (Revised) (1948)
- Am I Trustworthy? (1950)
- American Square Dance (1947)
- Ancient Egypt (1952, revised 1976)
- Ancient Rome (1949)
- Ancient World Inheritance (1946)
- The Apache Indian (1945)
- Appreciating Your Parents (1950)
- Aptitudes and Occupations (1941)
- Are You a Good Citizen? (1949)
- Are You Popular? (1947)
- Are You Ready for Marriage? (1950)
- Attitudes and Health (1949)
- Banks and Credits (1948)
- Basketball for Girls Fundamentals (1948)
- Basketball for Girls Game Play (1948)
- Beethoven and His Music (1953)
- Beginning Responsibility: Being on Time (1951)
- Beginning Responsibility: A Lunchroom Goes Bananas (1970, revised 1978)
- Beginning Responsibility: Taking Care of Things (1951)
- Beginning to Date (1953)
- The Benefits of Looking Ahead (1950)
- Better Use of Leisure Time (1950)
- Biography of a Red-winged Blackbird (1943)
- Birds of Inland Waterways (1946)
- Bookkeeping and You (1947)
- The Boyhood of Thomas Edison (1954)
- Build Your Vocabulary (1948)
- Building Better Paragraphs (1953)
- Capitalism (1948)
- Choosing Your Marriage Partner (1952)
- Choosing Your Occupation (1949)
- Citizenship and You (1959)
- City Fire Fighters (1947)
- Cleanliness and Health (1949)
- Clothes and You: Line and Proportion (1954)
- Communism (1952)
- Control Your Emotions (1950)
- Date Etiquette (1952)
- Dating Do's and Don'ts (1949)
- Developing Friendships (1950)
- Developing Responsibility (1949)
- Developing Self-Reliance (1951)
- Developing Your Character (1950)
- Earning Money While Going to School (1950)
- The Earth: Changes in its Surface (1960)
- Everyday Courtesy (1948)
- Exercise and Health (1949)
- Exploring Space: Beyond the Solar System (1978)
- Facing Reality (1954)
- Family Life (1949)
- Forests and Conservation (1946)
- Fossils: Clues to Prehistoric Times (1957)
- Friendship Begins at Home (1949)
- Fun of Being Thoughtful (1950)
- Fun of Making Friends (1950)
- Fun that Builds Good Health (1950)
- Fun with Words - Words That Rhyme(1970)
- Getting Ready Emotionally (1951)
- Getting Ready Morally (1951)
- Getting Ready Physically (1951)
- Going Steady? (1951)
- Goldilocks and the Three Bears (1953)
- Good Eating Habits (1951)
- Good Sportsmanship (1950)
- Good Table Manners (1951)
- Gossip (1953)
- Health: Your Posture (1953)
- High School: Your Challenge (1952)
- Halloween Safety Second Edition (1985; updated version of original 1977 Halloween Safety film produced by Centron Corporation)
- Hopi Indian (1945)
- Hoppy, the Bunny: Background for Reading and Expression (1953)
- How Billy Keeps Clean (1951)
- How Do You Know It's Love? (1950)
- How Friendly Are You? (1951)
- How Honest Are You? (1950)
- How Quiet Helps at School (1953)
- How to Be Well Groomed (1948)
- How to be Well Groomed (1949)
- How to Develop Interest (1950)
- How to Keep a Job (1949)
- How to Say No (1951)
- How to Say No (Moral Maturity) (1951)
- How to Study (1946)
- I Want to Be a Secretary (1941)
- Improve Your Personality (1951)
- Improve Your Spelling (1948)
- Introduction to Electricity (1948)
- Introduction to Foreign Trade (1951)
- Joan Avoids a Cold (1947)
- Keeping Clean and Neat (1956)
- Law and Social Controls (1949)
- Let’s Play Fair (1949)
- Let's Share with Others (1950)
- Let's Share with Others (second edition, 1967)
- Library Organization (1951)
- Life in Lost Creek (commemorative coin)
- Life in the Central Valley of California (1949)
- Life in the Far East
- The Littlest Angel (animated film, 1950)
- The Little Engine That Could (animated film, 1963)
- Lunchroom Manners (1960)
- Making Word Pictures (1973)
- Marriage Is a Partnership (1951)
- The Mighty Columbia River (1947)
- Mind Your Manners! (1953)
- More Dates for Kay (1952)
- Molly Grows Up (1953)
- Mother Goose Rhymes (1958)
- Mozart and His Music (1953)
- Nature of Sound (1948)
- Navajo Night Dances (1957)
- Office Practice: Your Attitude (1972)
- Our Wonderful Body: How It Moves (1968)
- Our Wonderful Body: How We Breathe (1968)
- Our Wonderful Body: How We Keep Fit (1968)
- Overcoming Fear (1950)
- Personal Hygiene for Boys (1952)
- Plantation System in Southern Life (1950)
- Powers of Congress (1947)
- Punctuation Mark Your Meaning (1948)
- Puritan Family of Early New England (1955)
- Rest and Health (1949)
- Right or Wrong? (1951)
- Rivers of the Pacific Slope (1947)
- Ruby-Throated Hummingbird (1942)
- Safe Living at School (1948)
- School Rules: How They Help Us (1952)
- Schubert and His Music (1953)
- Secretary’s Day (1947)
- Self-Conscious Guy (1951)
- Selling as a Career (1953)
- Service and Citizenship (1951)
- Sharing Work at Home (1949)
- Shy Guy (1947)
- Snap Out of It! (1951)
- Social Courtesy (1951)
- The Solar System (1950)
- Southwestern States (1942)
- Spring Comes to the City (1967)
- Starting Now (1951)
- Taking Responsibility for Your Actions (1953)
- Trading Centers at the Pacific Coast (1947)
- Understanding the Dollar (1953)
- Understanding Your Emotions (1950)
- Understanding Your Ideals (1950)
- Ways to Settle Disputes (1950)
- What is a Corporation? (1949)
- What Is Business? (1948)
- What Is Money? (1947)
- What Makes a Good Party? (1950)
- What to Do on a Date (1951)
- Where Does Our Meat Come From? (1960)
- Who Are the People of America? (1953)
- Why Punctuate? (1948)
- Why We Respect the Law (1950)
- Writing Better Social Letters (1950)
- You and Your Family (1946)
- You and Your Parents (1949)
- You and Your Parents (1950)
- Your Family (1948)
- Your Thrift Habits (1948)

== Production ==
Select Coronet productions are now available as public-domain resources, such as:

- Biography of a Red-winged Blackbird (1943) at Internet Archive
- Mighty Columbia River (1947) at Internet Archive
- Dating Do's and Dont's (1949) at Internet Archive
- The Fun of Making Friends (1950) on YouTube
- Going Steady? (1951) at Internet Archive
- Communism (1952) at Dailymotion
