= Trial and Error (Woodford book) =

Book by Jack Woodford

Trial and Error: a dithyramb on the subject of Writing and Selling
- Title page for Trial and Error: a dithyramb on the subject of Writing and Selling (1935)
- Author: Jack Woodford
- Language: English
- Subject: Publishing
- Genre: Non-fiction
- Publication date: 1933

Trial and Error: a dithyramb on the subject of Writing and Selling is Jack Woodford's book on writing and the publishing industry. The book focuses on writing and editing and describes the behind-the-scenes machinations that result in the final publication of writing.

The book was instrumental in the writing careers of Ray Bradbury, Robert A. Heinlein, Jerry Pournelle, Piers Anthony, and Richard A. Lupoff. The Notebooks of Raymond Chandler contain a paraphrased excerpt from Trial and Error that Chandler wrote from memory, entitled "Jack Woodford's Rules for Writing a Novel."

The introduction was written by the founder of Esquire magazine Arnold Gingrich.
