= Christopher Straub =

American fashion designer (born 1979)

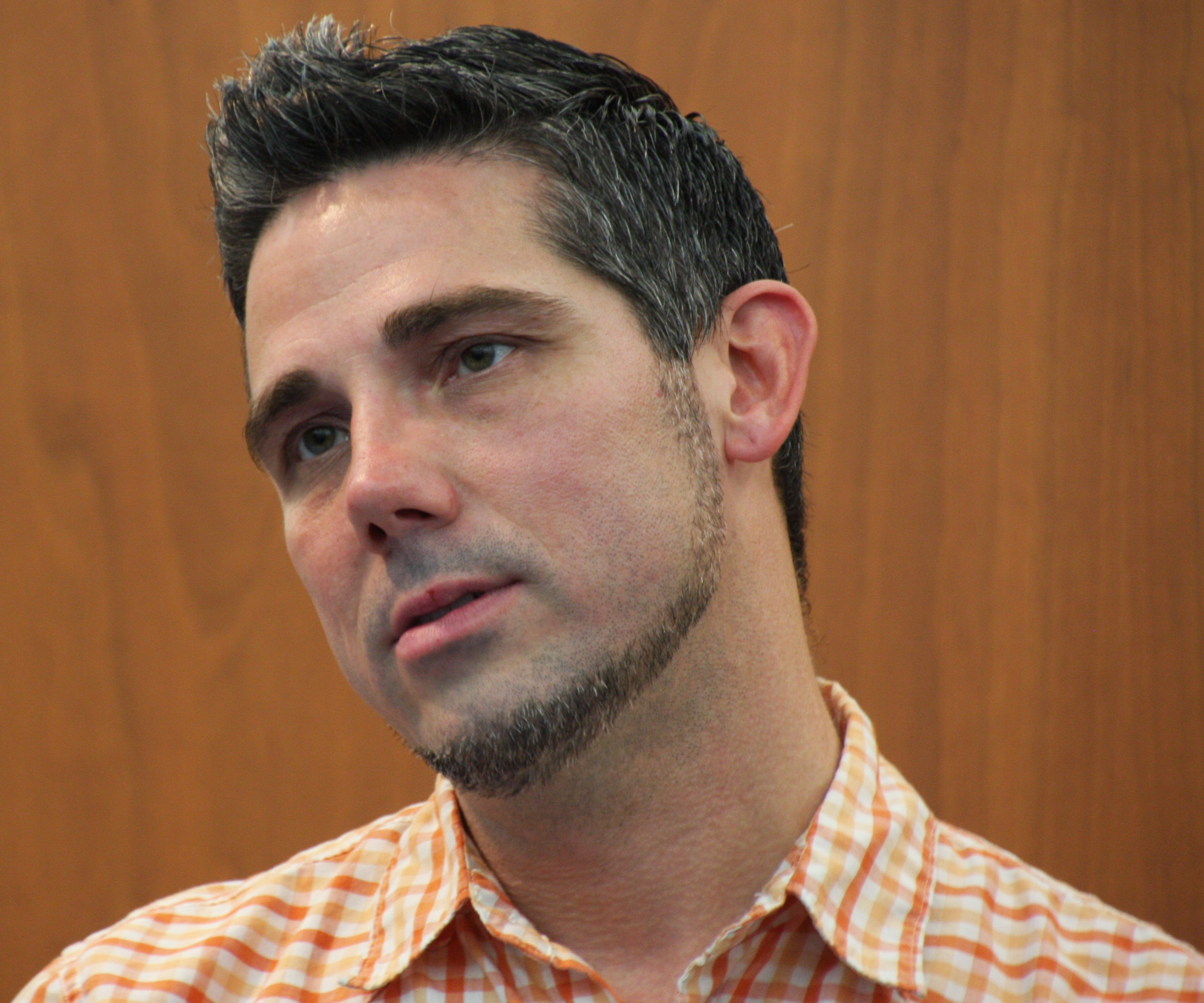
- Straub in 2016
- Born: January 5, 1979 (age 47)
- Education: Self-taught
- Occupation: Fashion Designer
- Television: Project Runway Season 6 (5th)
- Website: www.christopherstraub.com

Christopher Straub is a fashion designer who was a contestant on season 6 of the competitive reality show Project Runway and also appeared on season 1 of the competitive reality show Models of the Runway as the designer for the model Katie Sticksel, Celine Chua, and Matar Cohen. Both shows appeared on the Lifetime Network with new episodes aired on Thursday evenings.

== Biography ==
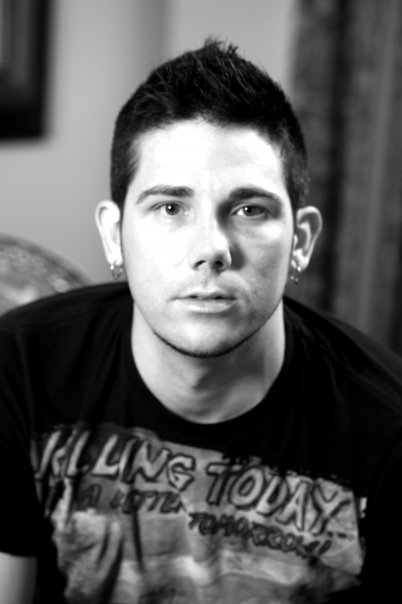
Straub in 2009

Christopher Michael Straub was born January 5, 1979, in St. Louis Park, Hennepin County, Minnesota, the son of Michael Steven Straub and Carole Jean Weckman. He grew up in the suburbs of Minneapolis/St Paul, graduated from Edina High School in Edina, Minnesota, and currently lives in Shakopee, Minnesota. Straub is a self-taught designer with no formal training.

Straub won the first challenge of the sixth season of Project Runway titled 'Welcome to Los Angeles' with guest judge Lindsay Lohan. Straub was 'in' with the second, third and fourth challenge, in the 'top 3' with the fifth and sixth challenge, in the 'bottom 3' with the seventh, eighth, ninth, tenth and eleventh challenges, and eliminated from the competition in the twelfth challenge.

The models for the designers are selected during the spin-off show Models of the Runway. Straub selected to work with his original model Katie Sticksel for the first six challenges. On the sixth episode of Models of the Runway, the designers were required to select a different model which resulted in Straub selecting Celine Chua. Straub returned to Katie Sticksel when selecting during the seventh episode and continued to work with her by selecting her in the eighth episode. In the ninth episode of Models of the Runway, the designers were required to select a different model which resulted in Straub selecting Matar Cohen. In the tenth episode of Models of the Runway, Straub again chose to work with Katie Sticksel and continued to work with her by selecting her again in the eleventh episode.

Since the premiere of the sixth season of Project Runway Straub has released a line of accessories through his personal website and projectrunway.com. This is Straub's second clothing line as he had previously launched (and later terminated in June 2010) his Cricket Syndicate line, which used vintage T-shirts to construct boxer briefs.

== Designs ==
Straub was announced in July 2014 (through a KICKSTARTER campaign) as the author, illustrator, and designer of a children's book and plush toy design named Albert the Confused Manatee. The Kickstarter campaign successfully ended on August 22, 2014, and currently Straub's book and plush toy are available at several Minneapolis/St. Paul boutiques as well as Straub's personal website.

Straub designed and constructed several gowns that appeared in the 2012 film Death To Prom.

In November 2011 it was announced that Straub would be producing a line of clothing and accessories with maurices women's clothing stores. The clothing line is branded Christopher Straub for maurices and features high style clothing at stores nationwide. As part of the collection Straub also produced a stuffed beagle named Cooper with all proceeds benefiting the American Cancer Society. Straub returned to maurices to produce a Spring 2012 collection featuring unique in-store jewellery designs and on-line exclusive clothing items.

A detailed interview as well as photos of Straub's Spring/Summer 2011 runway pieces appeared in the March 24-April 6 issue of Lavender Magazine. As an active LGBT member and Minneapolis/St. Paul area resident this interview and accompanying photos carried additional importance and were the first photos released of Straub's Spring/Summer 2011 collection.

A dress designed and created by Straub was worn by pop artist Brittani Senser during the 2010 Teen Choice Awards on August 9, 2010. Brittani Sensor attended the event with the controversial Levi Johnston.

In early 2010, Straub announced the date of his Premiere Collection Runway Show scheduled for Sunday April 25, 2010 at the Saint Paul Hotel in Saint Paul, Minnesota. This was Straub's first runway show since he appeared on Project Runway season 6 and it featured signature fabric manipulation and exclusive handbag designs.

On December 16, 2009, it was announced that Straub would be appearing as a vendor on the home shopping network ShopNBC. Straub appeared on ShopNBC on Friday, December 18, 2009, showcasing his wallets, handbags, and accessories.

== Endorsements and appearances ==
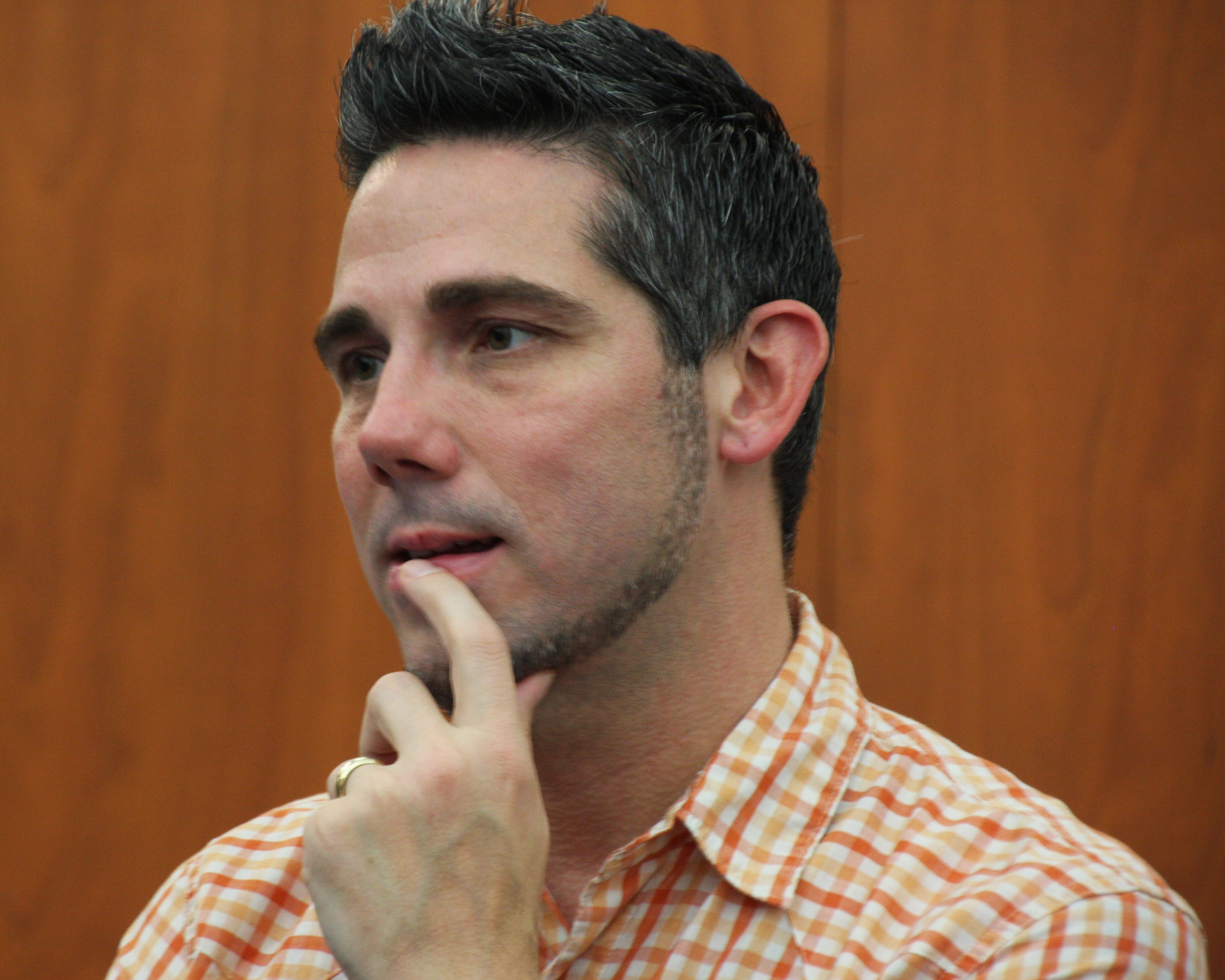
Straub in 2016

Announced in January 2015, Straub collaborated with General Mills to design the Yoplait Signature Collection exclusively at Target Stores (US locations) through February 2015. The Yoplait Signature Collection consists of a series of limited edition yogurt cups (designed by Christopher Straub). The flavor cups created by Straub include Blueberry Patch (light), Key Lime Pie (light), Strawberry Banana (light), Strawberry (original), Orange Creme (original), and Harvest Peach (original). The collaboration extends to include Target in-store marketing, private media event at the 2015 Mercedes Benz Fashion Week in New York City, and online videos and marketing.

In 2013, Straub appeared on two episodes (episode 504 and 508) of the PBS show It's Sew Easy.

Straub worked with Jo-Ann Stores in September 2012 to promote National Sewing Month with a contest, series of videos, and in-store promotions.

Straub was referenced in the book Gunn's Golden Rules: Life's Little Lessons for Making It Work (ISBN 978-1439177716) by Tim Gunn on page 13 and Straub (and Straub's designs) are also mentioned and pictured in the book Project Runway: The Show That Changed Fashion (ISBN 978-1602861787) by Eila Mell.

As an underwear designer Straub was asked to give praise for the book In the Mood For Munsingwear: Minnesota's Claim to Underwear Fame Published by MHS Press (April 2011) ISBN 978-0-87351-822-2. This book is being released as part of the new Underwear: A Brief History exhibit at the Minnesota History Center on May 7, 2011. Straub will be appearing with other Minnesota designers to honor the local Munsingwear tradition at the Minnesota History Center RetroRama on May 7, 2011.

On March 14, 2011, Straub was announced as a celebrity judge and endorsement for the maurices Main Street Model Search. In addition to playing a key role in maurices Main Street Model Search, Straub is working on product design and development for maurices that is due to release later in 2011. Straub returned as the celebrity judge, stylist, and fashion designer for the 2012 maurices Main Street Model Search.

In 2011 Straub has continued as a celebrity guest for various Home & Garden Shows organized by the Minnesota-based company Marketplace Events. Straubs appearances at the Home & Garden Shows include a presentation of a garment created with materials from a national home improvement store.

In 2011 Straub continued his work with the Minnesota-based Child Neurology Foundation annual Mardi Gras Event with Mardi Gras inspired fashions.

As of November, 2010 Straub was publicly announced as a celebrity spokesperson for the Minnesota-based same-sex equality organization Project 515.

== Media coverage ==
Straub has been interviewed for or appeared in the following notable media publications:

- Oprah (magazine)
- Lavender (magazine)
- Target Corporation Holidazzle Parade
- KSTP-TV Twin Cities Live
- Entertainment Weekly Online
- AOL.com
- Sirius XM Radio
- KARE 11 (Minneapolis/St. Paul)
- USA Today
- TV Guide Magazine
- The Rachael Ray Show
- The New York Times
- People Magazine
- Minneapolis-St.Paul Star Tribune
- Metro Magazine
- vita.mn
- Shakopee Valley News
- City Pages
- The Onion
