= Rossopomodoro =

Italian pizza restaurant chain

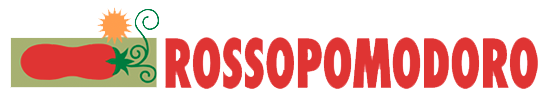

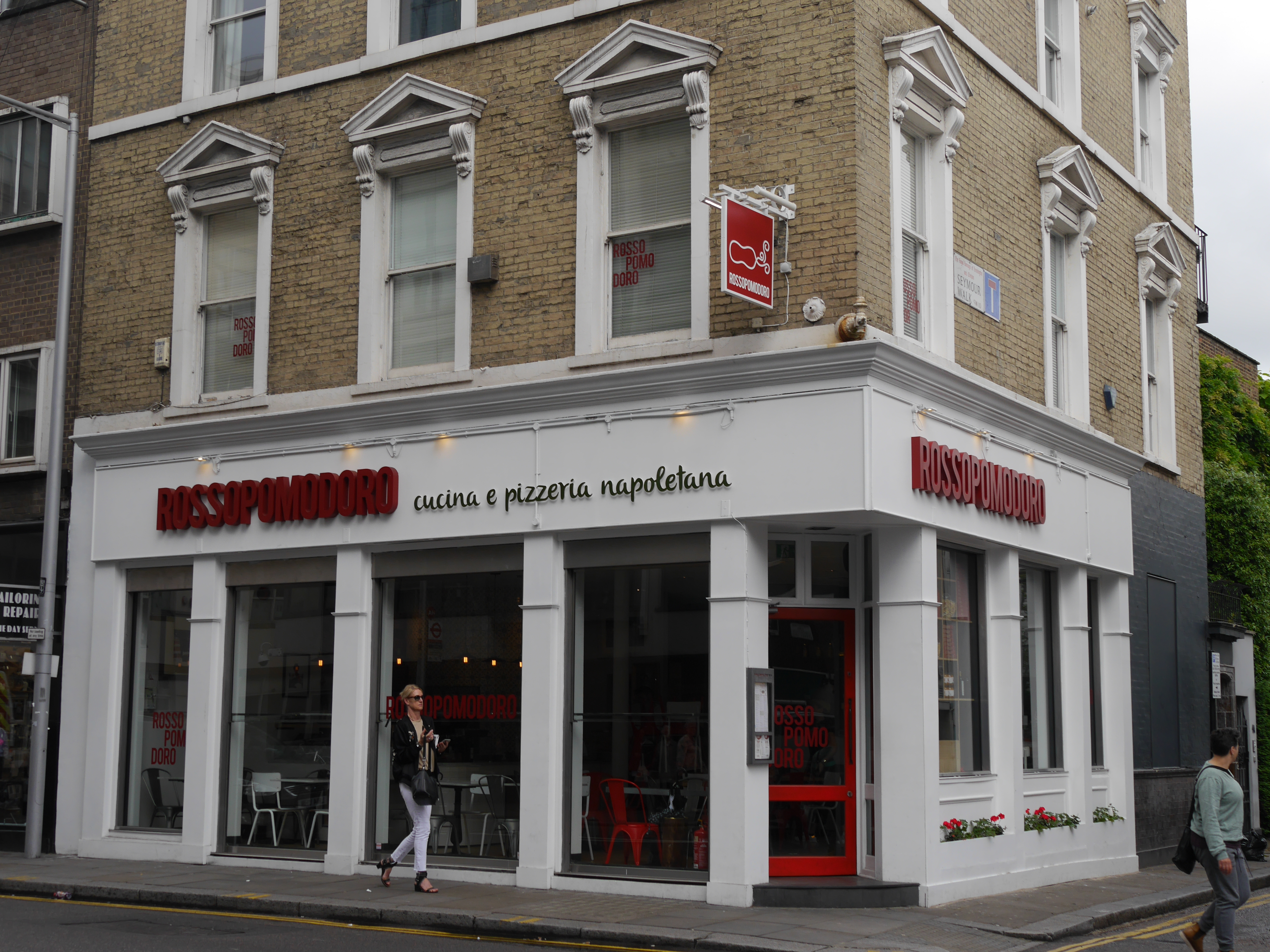
- Fulham Road, Chelsea, London location
- Industry: Restaurant
- Founded: 1997; 29 years ago
- Headquarters: Naples, Italy
- Number of locations: 103
- Area served: Italy, Brazil, Canada, Denmark, Germany, Iceland, Malta, United Kingdom, United States, Czech Republic, Philippines, Turkey, Saudi Arabia, Japan, France
- Products: pizza, pasta
- Parent: OpCapita

Rossopomodoro is an Italian pizza restaurant chain, headquartered in Naples, with outlets in Italy, the UK, France, Germany, Iceland, the Philippines, Turkey, Denmark, the US, Saudi Arabia, Japan, Brazil, Czechia and Malta.

They were founded by three former professional rugby players, and have about 70 outlets in Italy, and expanded into the UK in 2006.

They have ten outlets in the UK, as of June 2016, seven of which are in London.

They have outlets in six Eataly locations in the United States.

In March 2018 Sebeto, Rossopomodoro's parent company, was acquired by OpCapita from Change Capital, both London-based private equity firms, for an undisclosed price.

In May 2024, the first stand alone location opened in the US in Denver, Colorado.

There are two locations in Prague, downtown and Vinohrady, as of June 2024.

In March 2025, Rossopomodoro opened its first branch in Asia at the SM Mall of Asia in Pasay, Philippines.
