= Dating Do's and Don'ts =

1949 film

- Directed by: Ted Peshak; Gilbert Altschul
- Written by: George Tychsen
- Produced by: Dick Creyke; David Smart
- Starring: Jackie Gleason; John Lindsay
- Edited by: Dick Kirschner
- Distributed by: Coronet Instructional Media
- Release date: 1949
- Running time: 13 minutes
- Country: USA
- Language: English

Dating Do's and Don'ts is a 1949 instructional and social guidance film designed for American high schools, to teach adolescents basic dating skills, produced by Coronet Instructional Films and directed by Gilbert Altschul with the assistance of Reuben Hill, Research Professor of Family Life at the University of North Carolina.

== Background ==
In this film, the boy is the sole initiator of any contact with the girl, and all arrangements are made under the warm supervision of the family, particularly a mother who is a matriarchal housewife. This film, as many of the other educational shorts of the post World War II era, denotes the traditional socially conservative values that were common in the early to mid 20th century. His mother, as the film was released in the late 1940s, was raised during the end of the Victorian era, in the 1910s or 1920s decade, supposing she is middle aged, where the custom of "courtship" was commonplace and is new to the "dating" concept, but she accepted it.

The film is one of many public domain films in the Prelinger archives.

== Cast ==
- Jackie Gleason as Ann Davis (uncredited)
- John Lindsay as Alan Woodruff (uncredited)

== Woody's first date ==
The 1949 film

The film follows a young adolescent boy named Allan Woodruff, nicknamed Woody, who receives tickets for "one couple" to the Hi-Teen Carnival. At different stages, the film offers options on how Woody might respond to various situations:

1. What kind of girl should he date?
2. How should he ask her out?
3. How should he say good night after the date is over?

The film then shows three options, for each opportunity, ending with what it deems the most successful. This allows the filmmakers to create an idealized scenario for a perfect first date. Woody is cautioned not to ask a girl out based on her looks as she could be aloof or boring. Instead he should ask a girl who is "fun". He is similarly told to be straightforward and not to insist that his potential date give up some other activity for him. Finally, the film depicts the perceived danger of immediately kissing the girl good night, or of just leaving her at her door, and instead urges the viewers to say a friendly goodbye, ending with a promise to call next week.

As Woody prepares for his date with Anne, he receives hints from his older brother, who is already an expert at dating; for instance, Woody's brother tells Woody to act like his "natural, talkative self" while on the phone, and says that Woody does not have to bring Anne flowers on her first date. He also convinces their mother to allow Woody to go on his first date even though he is young, with her adding that it would be acceptable provided that Woody only dates on weekends and comes home at a reasonable hour. As Woody prepares for his date, his mother and father reflect on their own first dates to remind Woody how important it is for him to show up on time. His mother adds that any girl who is not ready for him on time is not worthy of going out with "my boy".

The film ends with Woody leaving the door outside Anne's home, whistling happily as he contemplates his next date.

== See also ==
- Sex education
- Sexual morality
- Teenage pregnancy
- Sexual abstinence
