= OpCapita =

British private equity firm

- Type: Limited liability partnership
- Industry: Private Equity
- Founded: 2006; 20 years ago
- Founder: Henry Jackson
- Headquarters: London, United Kingdom
- Area served: Europe and North America
- AUM: $600 million (2025)
- Website: www.opcapita.com

OpCapita was a British private equity firm specialising in the retail, consumer and leisure industries. The firm invested in underperforming businesses that require operational support to improve profitability and create long-term, sustainable value. OpCapita was established in 2006, by American financier Henry Jackson.

The firm was based in London and invested on behalf of a diversified group of international institutional investors. OpCapita was a full member of Invest Europe and a signatory of the UN Principles for Responsible Investment.

== History ==
In October 2006, OpCapita acquired British furniture retailer MFI for £1. In March 2008, it acquired French retailer BUT. In November 2011, the firm purchased the electronics retailer Comet from Kesa for £2. In March 2012, OpCapita, through its subsidiary Baker Acquisitions, purchased Game UK out of administration. A second subsidiary, Cherrilux Investments, was set up to buy Game's Spanish operations.

In October 2012, after a story about OpCapita considering a sale of Comet leaked to the press, suppliers lost confidence in the chain, and it subsequently entered administration. On 27 November 2013, it was announced that OpCapita had acquired NKD, a 2,000 store retailer in Germany, Austria, Italy, Croatia and Slovenia. OpCapita Operating Partner John von Spreckelsen became the Senior Shareholder Representative.

On 19 May 2014, Game announced its intention to float on the London Stock Exchange. OpCapita Operating Partner David Hamid, Chairman of Game, was quoted as saying "The turnround of the Game business is remarkable." By December 2014, Game had a market value in excess of £600 million, more than twelve times the amount OpCapita had paid for the business in 2012.

On 3 November 2014, OpCapita Consumer Opportunities Fund LP, OpCapita's first institutional fund raised from European and United States investors, announced the acquisition of La Sirena Alimentacion Congelada S.L.U., the leading frozen food retailer in Spain. The price was not disclosed, but press reports suggested they paid €30 million. 3i had paid €150 million for the business in 2006.

Financial News reported on 19 December 2014 that OpCapita had closed its début fund at just over £100 million. In December 2014, Private Equity International announced it had nominated OpCapita for "Special Situations Firm of the Year".

In October 2015, OpCapita won Private Equity International's Operational Excellence Award for its successful turnaround of Game. The firm was again nominated for "Special Situations/Turnaround Firm of the Year" in 2016, with Private Equity International saying "Industry maverick Henry Jackson’s firm closed Fund II – its first ten year vehicle – on its €350m hard cap, sold French homeware chain BUT to CD&R for an estimated €525m, snapped up womenswear retailer AppelrathCupper from Advent, and made some key hires".

Private Equity International reported on 2 June 2016 that OpCapita Consumer Opportunities Fund had acquired AppelrathCüpper from the global buyout house Advent International. The purchase price was not disclosed and Lincoln International served as a exclusive mergers and acquisitions advisor in the negotiation. PEI said this was the final investment from the OpCapita Consumer Opportunities Fund but that there was some capital remaining in the fund for additional investment into the existing portfolio companies.

On 29 July 2016, Unquote reported that OpCapita, backed by Goldman Sachs and Colony Capital, had exited the French homeware chain BUT for an estimated €525 million. The sale followed an extensive programme of operational improvement including reducing prices, changing sourcing to improve quality and reduce costs, exiting low margin products to focus on furniture and accessories, improving the promotional strategy and marketing, investing in every store to drive increased sales and increasing the number of stores to 303 at the time of the exit, leading to a market share gain from 9% to 13% during the holding period. The buyer was reported to be Clayton, Dubilier & Rice (CD&R) and WM Holding, an investment vehicle of Austrian furniture giant XXXL Lutz.

Private Equity International reported on 6 September 2016 that OpCapita had closed its Fund II at the hard cap of €350 million. It said the fund was raised from mid-April to the end of June, and was significantly oversubscribed. It added that the majority of investors in the fund, by both number and size, were pension plans, both public and corporate, university endowments and charitable foundations and that the success of the fundraising was as a result of the firm’s track record, which investors had been following closely in recent years.

On 12 January 2017, Real Deals nominated OpCapita for "Turnaround House of the Year" 2017. Sportech announced on 2 March 2017 that it had reached agreement to sell its football pools business to OpCapita for £83 million, a few months after a deal to sell the business to another financial buyer for approximately £100 million fell through.

Unquote reported on 3 November 2017 that OpCapita signed an agreement to acquire Merkal Calzados SLU, a 215-store business in Spain selling affordable footwear and accessories. It said this was OpCapita's third acquisition in Spain, following its investments in Game Spain in 2012 and La Sirena in 2014.

According to Reuters, OpCapita made its first investment in Italy on 9 March 2018 by acquiring Sebeto, an Italian restaurant group whose assets include the pizza chain Rossopomodoro. The price was not disclosed, although two sources said the deal values Sebeto at more than €80 million. OpCapita said it saw significant potential to grow the Rossopomodoro brand in Italy and abroad.

Real Deals reported on 19 March 2019 that OpCapita has agreed to sell German discount clothing retailer NKD Deutschland GmbH to buyout firm TDR Capital. NKD swung to a profit of 45 million euros ($51 million) in 2018 from a loss of 34 million euros at the time OpCapita invested five years earlier. Real Deals indicated that OpCapita achieved a return of more than 4x the capital it had invested, and it quoted Josh Spoerri, a managing director at OpCapita, as saying, "The turnaround we have achieved at NKD is emblematic of OpCapita's approach; taking a struggling consumer business and transforming it into a profitable, stable business with great prospects and that continues to delight its thousands of customers".

On 25 March 2019, WWD reported that OpCapita Consumer Opportunities Fund II LP has agreed to acquire a majority stake in women's apparel retailer Maurices Inc., OpCapita's first investment in the US. The deal, which values Maurices at $300 million, allows seller Ascena Retail Group Inc. (ASNA) to retain an interest in the Duluth, Minn.-based value retailer and certain management members to invest alongside OpCapita. Ascena's other brands include Dressbarn, Ann Taylor, Loft, Lane Bryant, Catherines and Justice. For its part, OpCapita has prior experience with clothing retailers, including its sale of 1,800-store-strong European clothing company NKD Vertriebs GmbH to TDR Capital LLP. WWD quoted Chris McDermott, a managing director at OpCapita, as saying Maurice's "provides [OpCapita with] a strong platform from which to apply the operational improvement strategies we have successfully implemented to drive growth and improve profitability in other businesses."

The Spanish press reported on 22 July 2021 that Excelsior Times, the holding company of Spanish entrepreneur José Elías, had acquired La Sirena from OpCapita following six years of OpCapita's ownership. During that time, EBITDA increased from €4 million to over €15 million. Elías was quoted as saying, "La Sirena is a great brand and an opportunity to contribute, together with the current management team, to promote and accelerate the strategic plan that began three years ago."

In September 2022, Soul Foods Group announced it had received a structured investment from Centerbridge Partners, Metric Capital Partners and OpCapita LLP to support the Company's plans to double its number of restaurants from 400 to 800 sites over the next five years. Soul Foods operates KFC, Taco Bell, Burger King and Starbucks franchises in the UK and Canada.

In February 2026, Private Equity International reported that OpCapita had notified its investors that Jackson would relocate to the US and hand over the monitoring of its portfolio to his long-time employees. It quoted Jackson as saying, “I am immensely proud of OpCapita’s track record over 20 years.”

== Investments ==
=== Current investments ===
Company	Sector	Country	Fund Investment Date
The Football Pools	Gaming	(United Kingdom)	June 2017
Merkal Calzados	Shoe retail	(Spain)	December 2017
Rossopomodoro	Restaurants	(Italy)	June 2018
Maurices	Women's clothing retail	(United States)	May 2019
Soul Foods Group	QSR	(United Kingdom) (Canada)	September 2022

=== Former investments ===
Company	Sector	Country	Investment Date	Realisation Date
La Sirena	Food retail	(Spain)	December 2014	July 2021
AppelrathCüpper	Multi-brand clothing retail	(Germany)	July 2016	October 2020
NKD	Discount clothing retail	(Germany)	March 2014	May 2019
Game	Video games retailer	(United Kingdom)	April 2012	June 2014
Game Iberia	Video games retailer	(Spain)	April 2012	June 2014
BUT	Home equipment retailer	(France)	April 2008	November 2016
Comet	Electrical retailer	(United Kingdom)	February 2012	November 2012
MFI	Kitchen and bathroom retailer	(United Kingdom)	October 2006	September 2008
