= The New Century Family Money Book =

1993 book by Jonathan D. Pond

- Author: Jonathan D. Pond
- Subject: Financial security
- Genre: Self-help
- Publisher: Dell Publishing
- Publication date: 1993
- Publication place: United States
- Media type: Print
- Pages: 781
- ISBN: 0-440-50478-3
- OCLC: 26673719

The New Century Family Money Book is a 1993 financial security self-help book by Jonathan D. Pond. It was first published on March 1, 1993, through Dell Publishing and covers topics such as home ownership, college, investing, careers, insurance, retirement, and income tax and estate planning.

The Chicago Sun-Times gave a positive review of the book upon its release and noted that it "covers every personal and family financial concern from basic investing to college aid formulas".
