= Jack Woodford =

American novelist (1894–1971)

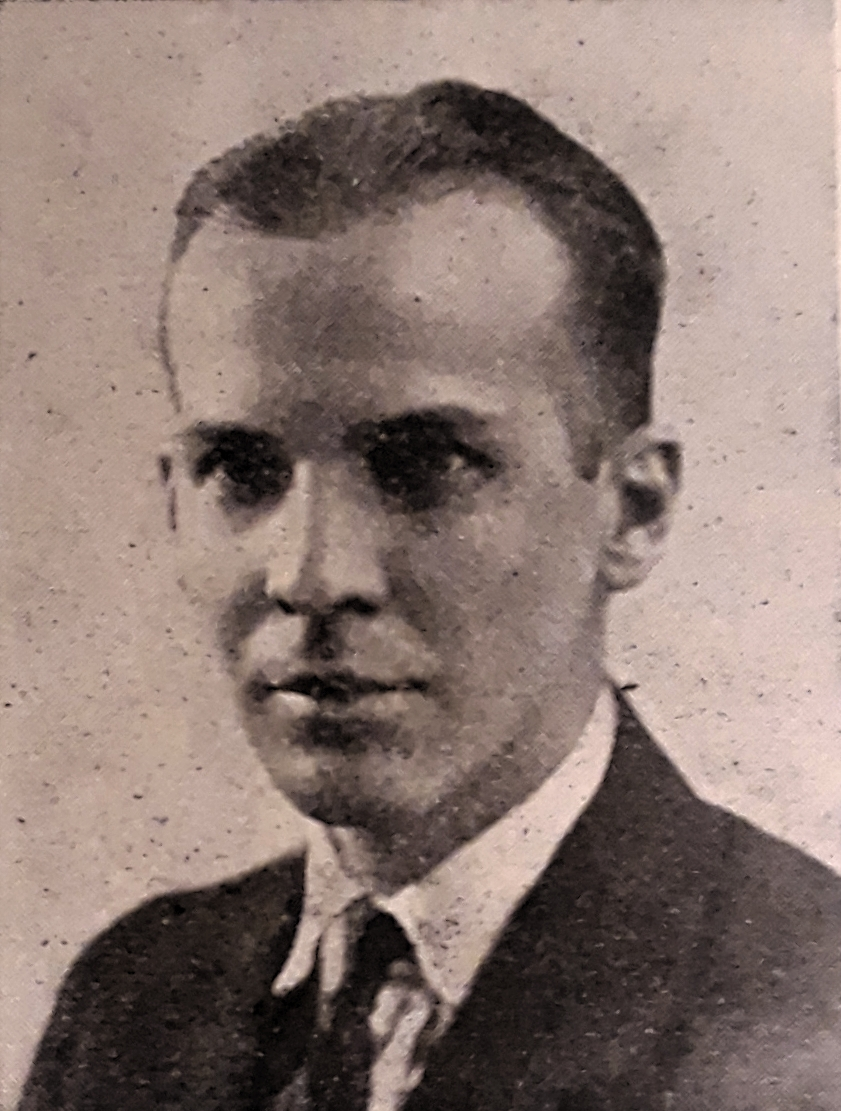
- Born: Josiah Pitts Woolfolk; 1894; Woodford County, Kentucky
- Died: 1971 (aged 76–77)
- Occupations: Non-fiction writer, author
- Notable work: Trial and error

Jack Woodford (1894–1971) was an American novelist and non-fiction writer, author of successful pulp novels and non-fiction, including books on writing and getting published. Most famously, Woodford authored Trial and Error, which caused something of a scandal at the time of publication because of its no-holds-barred insights into the publishing industry.

Born Josiah Pitts Woolfolk, he also wrote under the name Jack Woolfolk. The pen name "Jack Woodford" was derived from the first name of a writer he admired (Jack Lait, a writer for Hearst Publications) and the county where his father was born (Woodford County, Kentucky). Other pen names include Gordon Sayre, Sappho Henderson Britt, and Howard Hogue Kennedy.

== Life ==
Woodford grew up in Chicago when the dominant form of transportation was horse-drawn carriage. He was raised in well-to-do circumstances by his grandmother Annette (of Welsh stock) whom he called "Nettie". Nettie was a practicing member of Christian Science but was unable to bring Jack into the fold. Despite his general hatred of organized religion, Woodford joined the Freemasonry organization and remained a lifelong member.

His father was a doctor who started a private practice in Sioux City, Iowa, eventually moving it to Chicago. He later taught diagnosis at Rush Medical College, before dying at the age of forty-nine, likely from mercury poisoning. Calomel (mercurous chloride) was a popular medicine at the time and one the doctor himself used to excess. Woodford, always physically vibrant, thought of his father as a hypochondriac.

Woodford witnessed the Eastland disaster where the steamer ship rolled over in the Chicago River and killed 845 people. He gave a firsthand account to the Chicago newspaper the Herald-Examiner and described the event in Chapter 21 of his autobiography.

Among the many famous contemporaries Woodford befriended, the most notable are H. L. Mencken, writer/satirist James Branch Cabell, novelist Sherwood Anderson, composer George Antheil, and poet Ezra Pound. Woodford wrote a piece that was published in Pound's early Exile magazine. He also accompanied Winston Churchill when the former Prime Minister visited New York City.

Woodford was married on November 20, 1916, to the 16-year-old Josephine Hutchings, and divorced 17 years later. The only child from this marriage, Louella Woolfolk (who wrote under the pen name Louella Woodford), was also a published author who, at the age of 18, wrote a 273-page novel titled Maid Unafraid that was published in 1937 by Godwin.

Woodford founded Jack Woodford Press in the 1930s and the company's work was distributed by Citadel in the 1940s. The editors of the company in the 1940s were Allan Wilson and Aaron Moses ("Moe") Shapiro.

== Selected bibliography ==
Non-fiction

- Trial and error (1933)
- Plotting (also published as Plotting - How to Have A Brain Child) (1939) details numerous methods of creating plots for short stories, novels, and other works of fiction.
- Why Write A Novel? (1943, also published as How To Write and Sell A Novel)
- Plotting For Every Kind of Writing
- How To Write For Money (1944)
- The Loud Literary Lamas of New York (1950)
- Writer's Cramp (1953)
- Jack Woodford On Writing (1979) Compiled, selected, and edited by Jess E. Stewart, Woodford Memorial Editions, Seattle WA, second edition 1980 ISBN 0-9601574-1-7
- The Autobiography of Jack Woodford (1962, published under Jack Woolfolk)
- Home Away From Home (1962, a follow-up to the Autobiography describing the author's incarceration)
- My Years With Capone
- How to Make Your Friends and Murder Your Enemies (Published posthumously by Jess E. Stewart in 1981)
- The Rabelaisian Letters of Jack Woodford
- The Secret Confessions of Joseph Stalin: A third-dimensional Creative Confession of Life and Destiny

Fiction

- The Abortive Hussy (1947, Avon 146)
- City Limits- the novel was adapted for the screen in 1934- https://archive.org/details/City_Limits_1934
- The College Crowd (1963)
- Cravings (1963)
- Ecstasy Girl (1948)
- Evangelical Cockroach (an early [1929] collection of short stories)
- Find the Motive
- Five Fatal Days
- Four Eves
- Free Lovers
- Gentlemen from Parnassus
- God's Lap
- Grounds for Divorce (Love at Last) (1948)
- The Hard-Boiled Virgin (1947)
- Here is My Body
- Home Away from Home (1962)
- Illegitimate
- Illicit
- Indecent?
- Iris
- Journey to Passion (1950) - Revised version of "God's Lap"
- Lady Killers (1935, writing as Howard Kennedy)
- Male and Female (1950)
- Mirage of Marriage
- Passion in the Pines (1956)
- Person To Person Call
- Possessed
- Radio razz (1925)
- Rented Wife
- She Liked The Man
- Sin and Such (1930)
- Strangers In Love
- Surrender
- Tale Incredible: The True Story of Harry Stephen Keeler's Literary Rise (article)
- Temptress
- Three Gorgeous Hussies (1948)
- Traded Lives
- Unmoral
- Vice Versa
- White Heat
