= Roberto Parada (painter) =

- Born: 1969 (age 56–57)
- Education: Pratt Institute
- Known for: Illustration art

Roberto Parada (born 1969) is a freelance illustrator who has been creating paintings for major American magazines for over 20 years. Some of the publications include TIME Magazine, Rolling Stone, Reader's Digest, Fortune, Entertainment Weekly, Sports Illustrated and Esquire. Roberto graduated from Pratt Institute in Brooklyn, NY where he studied fine arts and illustration. Upon graduating in 1991, Roberto started working in the editorial illustration market.

== Information ==
He has created a vast array of portraits from the caricatured to the thought provoking which have captured the interests of Art Directors throughout the world. Roberto has created several cover illustrations for publications, including an Eminem cover for Rolling Stone. He illustrated the TIME Magazine cover of Suddam Hussein which had a bloody X through his face, a revival reminiscent of the cover in which TIME magazine put an X on the face of Hitler.

Roberto illustrated the poster for Carrie Fisher's Wishful Drinking performances at Arena Stage in Washington D.C.

In September 2004, Roberto had a successful bone marrow transplant from an anonymous donor, to cure severe Aplastic Anemia.
