= David A. Smart =

American magazine publisher

- Born: October 4, 1892; Omaha, Nebraska, U.S.
- Died: October 15, 1952 (aged 60); Chicago, Illinois
- Occupation: Magazine publisher

David Archibald Smart (October 4, 1892 – October 15, 1952), co-founder of Esquire magazine, and, with his brother Alfred Smart (1895–1951), co-publisher of Esquire and Coronet.

== Biography ==
He was born in 1892 to Mary Aronson (born January 1872) and Louis Smart (born February 1866) in Omaha, Nebraska. His father had emigrated from Russia in 1883. He had four siblings: Alfred Smart (1895–1951), John Smart, Vera Smart Elden (1899–1962), and Florence Smart Richards.

The family moved to Illinois. The brothers' other venture was Coronet Films, a producer of educational and training films during the 1950s. They endowed the Smart Museum of Art.

He died on October 15, 1952, in Chicago, Illinois.

== Siblings ==
=== Alfred Smart (1895–1951) ===
He was born in Omaha, Nebraska, on 17 June 1894 and attended the University of Illinois. After World War I, he joined his brother in Publishing Enterprises. He was secretary and treasurer until 1947 when he was appointed president of what was now Esquire, Inc. A third brother, John Smart, was a vice president. Alfred died on February 4, 1951, in Chicago.
