= Esquire (magazine) =

American men's magazine

- October 2013 cover highlighting Esquire's 80th anniversary
- Editor-in-Chief: Michael Sebastian
- Categories: Men's
- Frequency: 6 issues a year (Winter; March; April/May; Summer; September; October/November)
- Total circulation: 629,949 (Dec 2020)
- First issue: October 1933; 93 years ago
- Company: Hearst Communications
- Country: United States
- Based in: New York City
- Language: English
- Website: www.esquire.com
- ISSN: 0194-9535
- OCLC: 824603960

Esquire is an American men's magazine. Currently published in the United States by Hearst, it also has more than 20 international editions.

Founded in 1933, it flourished during the Great Depression and World War II under the guidance of founders Arnold Gingrich, David A. Smart, and Henry L. Jackson while during the 1960s it pioneered the New Journalism movement. After a period of quick and drastic decline during the 1990s, the magazine revamped itself as a lifestyle-heavy publication under the direction of David Granger.

== History ==
Esquire was first issued in October 1933 as an offshoot of trade magazine Apparel Arts (which later became Gentleman's Quarterly; Esquire and GQ would share ownership for almost 45 years). The magazine was first headquartered in Chicago and then, in New York City. It was founded and edited by David A. Smart, Henry L. Jackson and Arnold Gingrich. Jackson died in a plane crash in 1948, while Gingrich led the magazine until his own death in 1976. Smart died in 1952, although he left Esquire in 1936 to found a different magazine for the company, Coronet. The founders all had different focuses; Gingrich specialized in publishing, Smart led the business side of the magazine while Jackson led and edited the fashion section, which made up most of the magazine in its first fifteen years of publishing. Additionally, Jackson's Republican political viewpoints contrasted with the liberal Democratic views of Smart, which allowed for the magazine to publish debates between the two.

Esquire initially was supposed to have a quarterly press run of a hundred thousand copies. It cost fifty cents per copy (equivalent to $12.44 today). However, demand was so high that by its second issue (January 1934), it transformed itself into a more refined periodical with an emphasis on men's fashion and contributions by Ernest Hemingway, F. Scott Fitzgerald, Alberto Moravia, André Gide, and Julian Huxley.

In the 1940s, the popularity of the Petty Girls and Vargas Girls, particularly among the Armed Forces provided a circulation boost, but also proved controversial: in 1943, the Democratic United States Postmaster General Frank Comerford Walker brought charges against the magazine on behalf of the administration of Franklin Delano Roosevelt, which alleged that Esquire had used the US Postal Service to promote "lewd images". Republicans opposed the lawsuit and in 1946 the United States Supreme Court found in Hannegan v. Esquire, Inc., 327 U.S. 146 (1946), that Esquire's right to use the Postal Service was protected by the First Amendment of the United States Constitution.

During the 1950s, Al Moore replaced Petty and Vargas as the main pinup illustrator for Esquire. Petty illustrated for Esquire from 1933 to 1956, Vargas was hired to replace Petty in 1940 and was active until 1946.

Beginning with its second number, a blond, pop-eyed, mustachioed character named "Esky" (created by cartoonists E. Simms Campbell and Sam Berman), graced almost every Esquire front page for over a quarter of a century, depicting the refined character of the magazine and its readership, mostly in the form of figurines, although a stylized design of his face would often appear as well (replacing the figurines in the 1950s), and beginning in 1962, this graphic would be featured as the dot on the "I" of the logo until this was changed in 1978. After then, the character would be occasionally revived, most notably during the 1980s and 1990s, a short-lived "Esky" award given to popular rock bands during the 2000s and during Jay Fielden's tenure in the 2010s.

Under Harold Hayes, who ran it from 1961 to 1973, Esquire became as distinctive as its oversized pages, helping pioneer the trend of New Journalism by publishing such writers as Norman Mailer, Tim O'Brien, John Sack, Gay Talese, Tom Wolfe, and Terry Southern. In the mid-1960s, Esquire partnered with Verve Records to release a series of "Sound Tour" vinyl LPs that provided advice and music for traveling abroad. In August 1969, Esquire published Normand Poirier's piece, "An American Atrocity", one of the first reports of American atrocities committed against Vietnamese civilians. Like many other magazines of the era, Esquire shrank from the traditional large-magazine format (about 10 1/4 in × 13 3/8 in or 260 mm × 340 mm) to the smaller standard letter size (8 1/2 in × 11 in or 220 mm × 280 mm) in 1971.

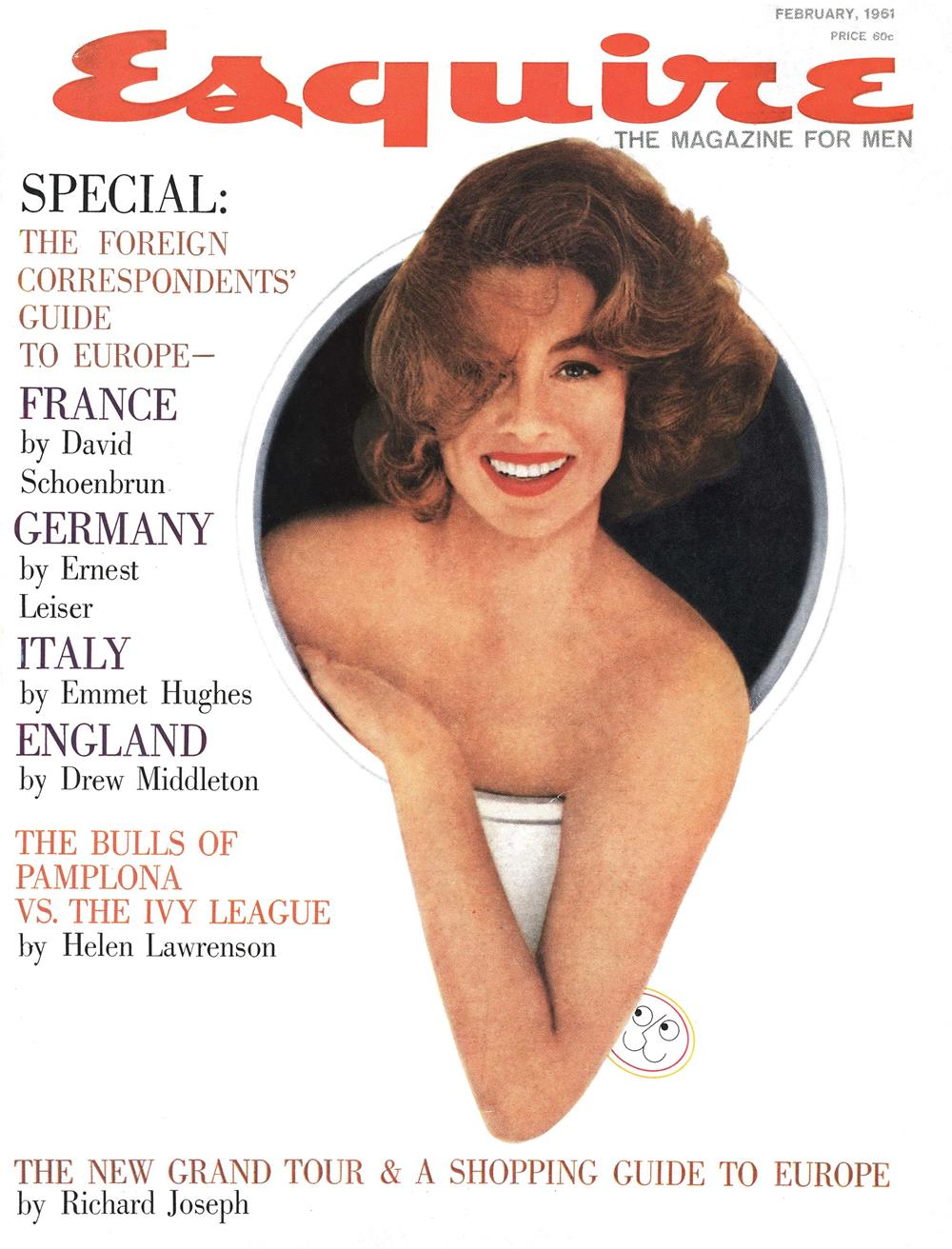
The cover of Esquire from February 1961

The magazine was sold by the original owners to Clay Felker in 1977 (although Esquire Inc. kept its name until its acquisition by Gulf + Western in 1983). Felker reinvented the magazine as a fortnightly in 1978, under the title of Esquire Fortnightly, ditching the script logo that had been used (with minor tweaks) since 1933. However, the fortnightly experiment proved to be a failure, and by the end of that year, the magazine lost US$5 million. Felker sold Esquire in 1979 to the 13-30 Corporation, a Tennessee-based publisher, which reverted the magazine into a monthly, beginning with the July issue (dated both as of July 3 and 19). In 1986, the 13-30 Corporation (renamed as the Esquire Magazine Group) launched the New York Woman magazine as something of a spin-off version of Esquire aimed at a female audience. The company split up at the end of the year, and Esquire was sold to Hearst, with New York Woman going its separate way to American Express Publishing, being published until 1992.

The arrival of male-oriented lifestyle publications during the early 1990s and the problems of the magazine industry during the middle of the decade led to a sustained decline in circulation that threatened the future of Esquire, which had relied upon an elegant, highly-literate audience (until the late 1970s, it published a "back-to-college" issue each September, and during the second half of the 1980s it published a year-end register featuring leading cultural figures under 40 years of age) but did not appeal to younger men. David M. Granger was named editor-in-chief of the magazine in June 1997, fresh from a six-year stint at GQ, which he turned around from its fashion-heavy tradition. After his arrival, the magazine received numerous awards, including multiple National Magazine Awards. Its award-winning staff writers include Tom Chiarella, Scott Raab, Mike Sager, Chris Jones, John H. Richardson, Cal Fussman, Lisa Taddeo, and Tom Junod. Famous photographers have also worked for the magazine, among which fashion photographer Gleb Derujinsky, and Richard Avedon. In spite of its success, the magazine under Granger became increasingly criticized for its focus on the so-called metrosexual culture (a criticism he previously had late in his GQ tenure). David Granger stepped down in 2016, being replaced by Jay Fielden, who revamped the magazine into its more classical up-market style. At the same time, its political coverage became more comprehensive, following a trend among American magazine publications in general. After a series of shake-ups at Hearst's magazine division, Michael Sebastian became editor in mid-2019, reverting to its 2000s-era style.

In September 2006, the magazine launched a special style-focused issue entitled The Big Black Book, which beginning in 2009 was published twice a year until the Spring/Summer issue ran for the last time in 2018.

In 2010, the June and July issues were merged as were the December and January issues in 2015, and in 2018 the magazine moved to eight issues per year.

== Blog ==
In January 2009, Esquire launched a new blog—the Daily Endorsement Blog. Each morning the editors of the magazine recommend one thing for readers' immediate enjoyment: "not a political candidate or position or party, but a breakthrough idea or product or Web site." The concept of the "Daily Endorsement Blog" was said to have emerged from Esquire's November 2008 issue called the "Endorsement Issue", in which, after 75 years, Esquire publicly endorsed a presidential candidate for the first time. The Daily Endorsement Blog was officially discontinued in April 2011.

== Fiction ==
From 1969 to 1976, Gordon Lish served as fiction editor for Esquire and became known as "Captain Fiction" because of the authors whose careers he assisted. Lish helped establish the career of writer Raymond Carver by publishing his short stories in Esquire, often over the objections of Hayes. Lish is noted for encouraging Carver's minimalism and publishing the short stories of Richard Ford. Using the influential publication as a vehicle to introduce new fiction by emerging authors, he promoted the work of such writers as T. Coraghessan Boyle, Barry Hannah, Cynthia Ozick, Reynolds Price and William Harrison.

In February 1977, Esquire published "For Rupert – with no promises" as an unsigned work of fiction: this was the first time it had published a work without identifying the author. Readers speculated that it was the work of J. D. Salinger, the reclusive author best known for The Catcher in the Rye. Told in first-person, the story features events and Glass family names from the story "For Esmé – with Love and Squalor". Gordon Lish is quoted as saying, "I tried to borrow Salinger's voice and the psychological circumstances of his life, as I imagine them to be now. And I tried to use those things to elaborate on certain circumstances and events in his fiction to deepen them and add complexity."

Other authors appearing in Esquire at that time included William F. Buckley, Truman Capote, Murray Kempton, Malcolm Muggeridge, Ron Rosenbaum, Andrew Vachss and Garry Wills.

During the mid-late 1980s, the magazine's June "Summer Reading" issues featured a full-length fiction story accompanied by shorter pieces, all written for the magazine.

Although the magazine greatly reduced its fiction content during the 1990s in line with most other magazines, it has nevertheless continued to publish fiction in occasion. Writer Elizabeth Gilbert debuted in Esquire in 1993, while Chris Adrian, Nathan Englander, Benjamin Percy, and Patrick Somerville among others have also contributed to the magazine. Other writers who have recently appeared in Esquire include Ralph Lombreglia, James Lee Burke, and Stephen King.

=== The Napkin Fiction Project ===
In 2007, Esquire launched the Napkin Fiction Project, in which 250 cocktail napkins were mailed to writers all over the country by the incoming fiction editor, in a playful attempt to revive short fiction—"some with a half dozen books to their name, others just finishing their first". In return, the magazine received nearly a hundred stories. Rick Moody, Jonathan Ames, Bret Anthony Johnston, Joshua Ferris, Yiyun Li, Aimee Bender, and ZZ Packer are among the notable writers included.

== Dubious Achievement Awards ==
For many years, Esquire has published its annual Dubious Achievement Awards, lampooning events of the preceding year. As a running gag, the annual article almost always displayed an old photo of Richard Nixon laughing, with the caption, "Why is this man laughing?" However, the February 2006 "Dubious Achievement Awards" used the caption under a photo of W. Mark Felt, the former FBI official revealed in 2005 to be "Deep Throat", the source for Bob Woodward and Carl Bernstein to uncover the Watergate scandal. The magazine discontinued the Nixon photo in February 2007, referring to a poll stating that George W. Bush had surpassed Nixon as the "worst president ever".

A popular running gag featured in the "Dubious Achievements of 1990" edition involved especially egregious achievements headlined with "And then they went to Elaine's.", referring to a popular restaurant in New York City that closed in May 2011.

Esquire did not publish "Dubious Achievement Awards" for 2001, but resumed them with the 2002 awards, published in the February 2003 issue.

"Dubious Achievement Awards" were discontinued in 2008, according to an editor's note in the January 2008 issue, considering that the overabundance of imitators had made the feature superfluous. However, after a nine-year hiatus, the feature was revived in the January 2017 issue with a skewering of 2016 events.

== Sexiest Woman Alive ==
The annual Sexiest Woman Alive feature ran between 2003 and 2015, billed as a benchmark of female attractiveness and consisting of a photoshoot and profile of the winning woman. Originally, it was a part of the "Women We Love" issue that had appeared yearly since 1988 (after being a section of "The Passions of Men" issue, June 1987), being initially titled "Woman of the Year". To build interest, the magazine would do a tease, releasing partial images of the woman in the issues preceding the November issue. By 2007, it had become the dominating story of the issue and to create an element of surprise the hints were abandoned.

The feature was criticized for objectifying women. In a Slate article following Penélope Cruz's 2014 Sexiest Woman Alive profile, Katy Waldman called the article the "latest icky entry in the icky genre" and describing it as using "rapt, creepy, overheated language to say practically nothing about his subject, except that she is 'impossibly beautiful,' 'has no physical flaws,' 'looks like a thousand different women,' and 'can be whatever we want her to be.' (So, nothing.)". Waldman said the profiles "traffic in weirdo pious metaphors and exaggerations that aim to winkingly indicate how overcome a guy gets in the face of a gorgeous lady. But they just make men seem like drooling louts."

Year	Choice	Age
2004	Angelina Jolie	29
2005	Jessica Biel	23
2006	Scarlett Johansson	21
2007	Charlize Theron	32
2008	Halle Berry	42
2009	Kate Beckinsale	36
2010	Minka Kelly	30
2011	Rihanna	23
2012	Mila Kunis	29
2013	Scarlett Johansson	28
2014	Penélope Cruz	40
2015	Emilia Clarke	27

== Esky Music Awards ==
Esky Music Awards are awarded in the April issue.

== Awards and honors ==
National Magazine Awards

== International editions ==
Esquire operates 23 international editions:

- Esquire Australia (since 2023)
- Esquire Brazil (since 2025)
- Esquire Colombia (from 2012 to 2019, since 2025)
- Esquire España (since 2007)
- Esquire France (launching in 2026)
- Esquire Germany (from 1987 to 1992, since 2019)
- Esquire Greece (since 2002)
- Esquire Hong Kong (since 2014)
- Esquire India (since 2024)
- Esquire Italia (since 2018)
- Esquire Japan (from 1987 to 2009, since 2015)
- Esquire Kazakhstan (since 2005)
- Esquire Korea (since 1995)
- Esquire Malaysia (from 2011 to 2019, since 2026)
- Esquire México/Latinoamérica (since 2008)
- Esquire Middle East (since 2009)
- Esquire Philippines (since 2011)
- Esquire Saudi المملكة (since 2021)
- Esquire Singapore (from 2012 to ?, since 2023)
- Esquire Taiwan (since 2005)
- Esquire Thailand (from 1995 to 2018, since 2024)
- Esquire Türkiye (since 1993)
- Esquire UK (since 1991)
- Esquire Qatar (since 2022, as a special issue of Esquire Middle East since 2019)
- Esquire Vietnam (from 2013 to 2017, since 2025)

=== Ceased publication ===
- Esquire Bulgaria (launched in 2014)
- Esquire Central America (launched in 2008)
- Esquire Czech Republic (from 1996 to 2024)
- Esquire Indonesia (launched in 2007, closed in 2017)
- Esquire Nederland (launched in 1990, closed in 2021)
- Esquire Polska (launched in 2015, closed in 2019)
- Esquire Puerto Rico (launched in 2008)
- Esquire Romania (launched in 2007)
- Esquire Russia (launched in 2005, closed in 2022)
- Esquire Serbia (launched in 2013)
- Esquire South America
- Esquire Ukraine (launched in 2012)
- Esquire Venezuela (launched in 2009, closed in 2019)

== See also ==
- Allegra Coleman
- Esquire Network – A defunct television network based on the magazine
- Meyer Levin
- Men's Health UK
- Nat Mags (UK publisher)
- Roberto Parada
- Yulia Spiridonova (Russian photographer)
