= Braehead =

Shopping centre in Renfrewshire, Scotland

Braehead Shopping Centre

Braehead (Scots: Braeheid, Gaelic: Ceann a' Bhruthaich) is a commercial development located at the former site of Braehead Power Station in Renfrew on the south bank of the River Clyde in Renfrew, Renfrewshire. It is particularly notable for its large shopping centre, arena and leisure facilities. All originally part of Intu, the facilities are currently owned by Frasers Group, TDL Media and XPE Group plc respectively.

The area is known for its shopping centre of the same name, which was rebranded as Intu Braehead in 2013 and kept that name until 2020. The rebranding was done as part of a corporate rebranding exercise by Capital Shopping Centres plc, which itself was renamed as Intu Properties PLC.

== History ==
=== King's Inch ===
Until at least the 18th century, the site was an island in the River Clyde known as King's Inch (a name that is still reflected in the road that divides the site).

The initial castle at Renfrew was constructed on King's Inch in the 12th century by Walter Fitz-Alan, High Steward of Scotland.however It was deserted in the 13th century and substituted by a stone castle in what currently stands as the centre of Renfrew. By the latter portion of the 15th century, Sir John Ross was obtained the lands of Inch along with the remains of this castle, where he erected a three-storey castle known as the Inch Castle.

In 1769, the King's Inch was purchased by Glasgow tobacco merchant Alexander Speirs, who demolished Inch Castle in order to build a country mansion, Elderslie House. Completed in 1782 (demolished in 1924), Elderslie House was designed by Robert Adam.

=== Braehead power station ===
The power station was built after World War II, originally coal-fired but later converted to oil to reduce emissions. It was located on the north side of King's Inch Road, and remained operational into the 1980s, undergoing demolition in the 1990s.

=== The Braehead explosion ===
On 4 January 1977, a serious fire and explosion occurred at a warehouse in the Braehead Container Clearance Depot, adjacent to the Power Station. The fire was started accidentally by three boys who had lit a fire to warm themselves at a den that they had made, during the New Year holiday, from cardboard cartons stacked beside the warehouse. The fire detonated 70 tonnes (69 long tons; 77 short tons) of sodium chlorate weedkiller stored in the warehouse, producing a blast estimated by HM Inspectorate of Explosives as being equivalent to up to 820 kg (1,810 lb) of TNT.

About 200 stores and homes in Renfrew and Clydebank had their windows shattered by the explosion, which was heard throughout the entire Greater Glasgow region and sent flying debris as far as 2.8 km (1.7 mi) away. The explosion is estimated to have cost £6 million in damage. In large part due to the National Bank Holiday in observance of Hogmanay celebrations, there were no deaths. Twelve people required treatment for shock and minor injuries.

== Renfrew Riverside redevelopment ==
Braehead forms part of the Renfrew Riverside redevelopment area, a part of the wider Clyde Waterfront Regeneration project. The Braehead area includes:

- Braehead Shopping Centre (officially Frasers Plus Braehead);
- ice skating / curling facilities;
- Krispy Kreme doughnuts;
- The Braehead Arena - along with extensive covered and open-air car parking);
- GRID (formerly Xscape, Intu Braehead Soar and Xsite) adventure complex;
- A small business park.

== Clydebuilt, Braehead ==
From September 1999 to October 2010, the Scottish Maritime Museum operated Clydebuilt at Braehead, a museum which explored the history of the Clyde shipbuilding industry and the industrial development of Glasgow and the River Clyde.

The museum had been built by and was subsidised by the owners of the shopping centre, but after they withdrew support the museum became financially unviable and Scottish Maritime Museum were forced to close it and transfer its exhibits to their other sites at Irvine and Dumbarton.

The building is now occupied by Krispy Kreme.

== Grid Braehead ==
Grid Braehead (formerly known as Xsite Braehead, Intu Braehead Soar, Xscape Braehead) (55°52′45″N 4°22′17″W) began construction in November 2004 and was opened in March 2006 with its main use to teach people how to ski or snowboard. The building has a conventional shape, with the ski slope accommodated by a sloped cuboid structure projecting out the roof. The complex features a variety of entertainment activities, including an indoor ski slope, rock climbing, an Odeon, bowling, RoboCoaster, Paradise Island Adventure Golf and laser tag, as well as a variety of shops, restaurants, and bars.

The Snow Factor indoor snow slope featured a 168 m (551 ft) main slope with an additional 2,500 m^{2} (27,000 sq ft) dedicated beginners' area for ski and snowboard lessons. On the main slope, two Poma button lifts gave a drag tow to the top and could be exited either at the halfway point on the slope or at the top. Rope tows were used on the beginners slope.

In December 2011, SNO! Zone Braehead was acquired by the Ice Factor Group and renamed Snow Factor. Snow Factor closed permanently in 2023 due to rising costs and the age of the facility.

In March 2006, weeks before the complex was scheduled to open, the roof of screen seven of the Odeon fell in and required extensive re-building. The mini-golf (which is housed below the cinema) opened in July 2006. The cinema opened on 19 October 2007, 18 months later than planned. "Stardust" was the first film shown. The cinema is fitted with RealD 3D (also known as Disney Digital 3-D technology) in screen 7, and is also capable of showing IMAX films. The cinema held the Scottish Pink Carpet Premiere of Universal Pictures film "Wild Child" on 30 July 2008. Both stars of the film, Emma Roberts and Alex Pettyfer, attended.

In March 2018, an 18-metre (59 ft) high slide, known as The Big Slide, opened to the general public. It is the tallest indoor slide in the UK.

It has been announced that the ski slope structure is to be removed by the owners to create a multi level indoor ekarting track that is scheduled to open in 2026. At over 1,000 m (1,100 yd), the track will be one of the largest indoor tracks in the world.

== Further development ==
To the west of Braehead and adjacent to the town of Renfrew is the Renfrew Riverside area. Between the residential area and the shopping centre an Xscape complex (now named GRID), providing an indoor ski slope and other entertainments and leisure facilities opened in early 2006.

To the south of the shopping centre is a small development called Braehead Business Park.

== Transport ==
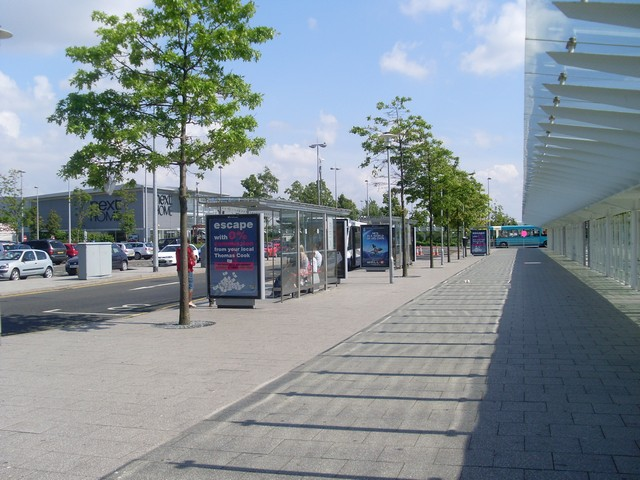
Braehead bus station

Braehead can be reached from Junctions 25a (westbound) and 26 (eastbound) of the M8 motorway, and has extensive public transport connections including its own bus station. Buses run from many areas linking Braehead to Largs, Greenock, Paisley, Glasgow, Erskine and Johnstone. The Pride of the Clyde ferry service ran from Glasgow City Centre to Braehead's pier down the River Clyde regularly until October 2007.

A road bridge between Renfrew and Yoker on the north bank of the Clyde was constructed in 2024, providing easier access to Braehead for residents in that sector of the city.

== Boundary dispute ==
After opening in 1999, Braehead was the subject of a boundary dispute between the Glasgow and Renfrewshire council areas, as originally the council boundary line divided the shopping centre in two. In 2002, a Local Government Boundary Commission ruling eventually redrew the boundary to include all of the centre in Renfrewshire, as this was the original ancient boundary. The boundary runs along Kings Inch Drive and is marked by a chain linked fence at this point.
