= Tessuti =

Chain of designer stores

- Type: Private
- Industry: Retail
- Founded: 1985
- Founder: David Light
- Headquarters: Bury, United Kingdom
- Area served: United Kingdom
- Products: Clothing
- Revenue: ▼£101.1 million (2021)
- Operating income: ▼£45 million (2021)
- Parent: JD Sports (2016-2022); Frasers Group (2022-)
- Website: www.tessuti.co.uk (Redirects to Flannels)

Tessuti was a chain of designer stores in the United Kingdom, retailing men’s and women’s designer collections, including clothing, shoes and accessories for men and women. Tessuti was founded in 1985 by David Light. In December 2022, Frasers Group acquired Tessuti from JD Sports who had previously owned the company in full since 2016.

As of 2019, Tessuti has thirty-eight stores, including doors in Liverpool, Chester, Leeds, Merryhill, Meadowhall Sheffield and Ipswich. The retailer also has two stores within Manchester's Trafford Centre and a Lowry Outlet store in Salford Quays. The multi-channel retailer also has stores inside Bluewater Shopping Centre, Metro Centre in Gateshead and Bradford Broadway. JD Sports PLC bought out menswear brand Cecil Gee in 2012, turning all five branches into Tessuti stores. Tessuti’s portfolio has also includes the Aspecto and Infinities retail businesses, bought by JD Sports PLC in 2015 and that form part of an ongoing re-brand underneath the Tessuti umbrella. New store openings in 2018 included a new store at Manchester Arndale and Glasgow Fort.

== History ==
David Light opened his first shop at 53 Watergate Row, Chester in April 1985. The first store to offer a number of international brands to Chester, Tessuti’s original store introduced new labels such as Stone Island, CP Company and Giorgio Armani to the city.

In May 2012, JD Sports Fashion plc acquired 40% of the business and then later in 2016 took control of Tessuti in full.

In late 2017, the brand suffered from undesirable publicity due to animal rights campaigners drawing attention to the fact that stores sell products using real animal fur and goose down.

In April 2018, Tessuti launched a flagship store in Chester at 30 Bridge Street, a grade II listed building and former Liberty store.

Tessuti was the principal sponsor of the Sports & Leisurewear Award at Graduate Fashion Week in 2018 and 2019. The 2019 winner of the Tessuti Sports & Leisurewear award was Katherine Jayne-Watts for her sustainable sportswear collection.

In December 2022 a £47.5m deal from Mike Ashley’s, Frasers Group saw Tessuti and 14 other brands be sold from previous owner JD Sports Fashion plc. As a result of the takeover, the Tessuti website was closed in May 2023 with visitors redirected to Flannels and all Tessuti stores gradually closed with Flannels stores opening in many towns which had a Tessuti store such as Blackburn.

The Tessuti website was launched in 2006 as an extension of the business offering the same brands available across the Tessuti stores.

== Etymology ==
The Tessuti name comes from the masculine plural of Tessuto, the Italian word for fabric.
