= Firetrap =

British clothing company

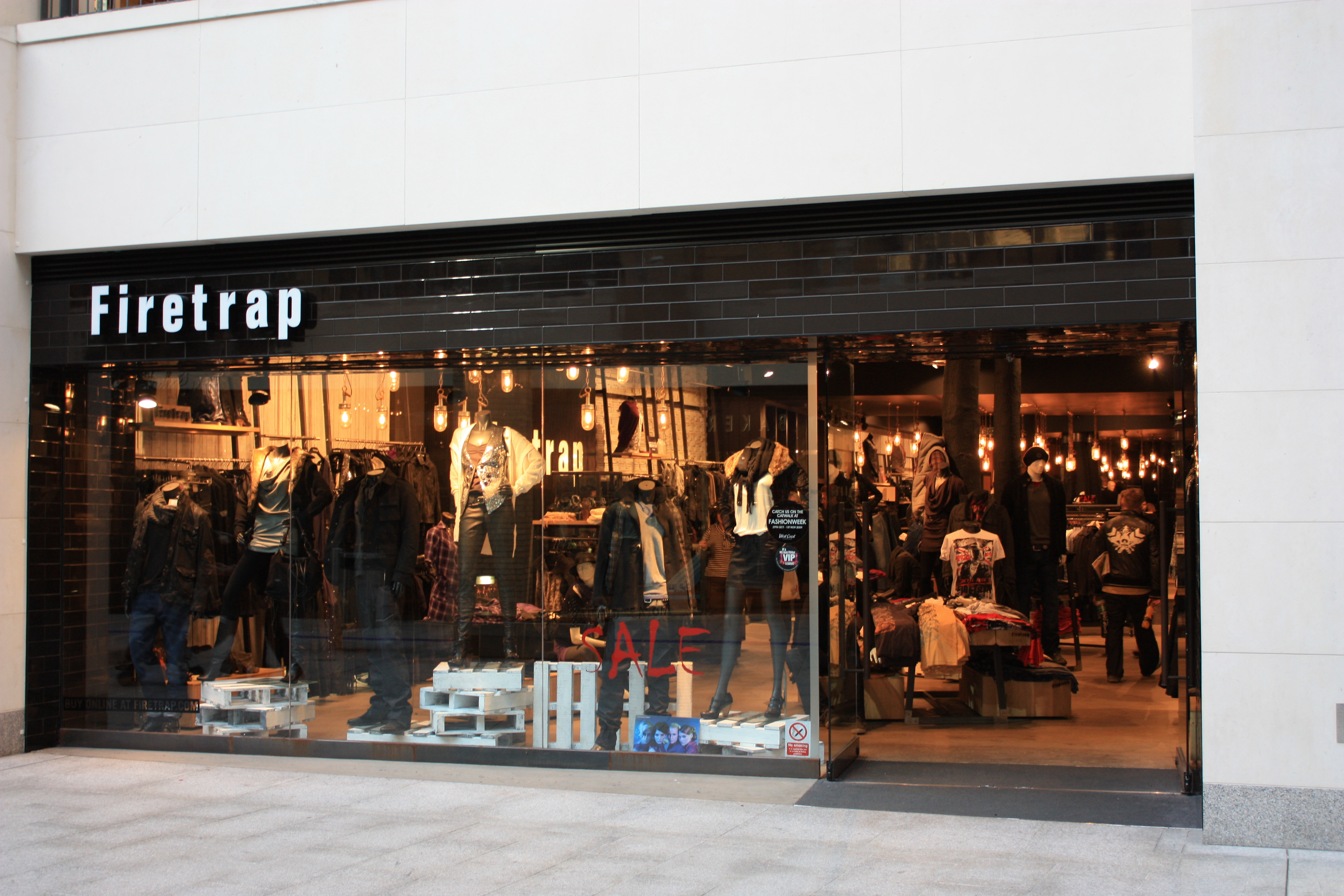
- Branch in Belfast, UK
- Product type: Clothing
- Current owner: Frasers Group
- Country: United Kingdom
- Introduced: 1993
- Markets: Textile, retail
- Website: firetrap.com

Firetrap is a British clothing company, founded in 1993, specialising in menswear and accessories. It was the main brand within the WDT company (World Design and Trade), which also owned its sister brand Full Circle along with previous brands SC51 and Sonnetti.

Firetrap grew in international markets from 2006 to 2008, under the leadership of MD John Gorman, before being sold to Sports Direct International.

Now owned by Frasers Group (the retail company founded by Mike Ashley), Firetrap had taken part of the Sports Direct group of global brands such as Slazenger, Gelert and Kangol, among others.

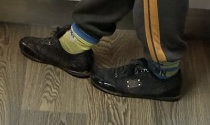
Firetrap trainers, as sold in the UK, with trademark chrome logo on the side
