= Frog Bikes =

UK children's bicycle manufacturer

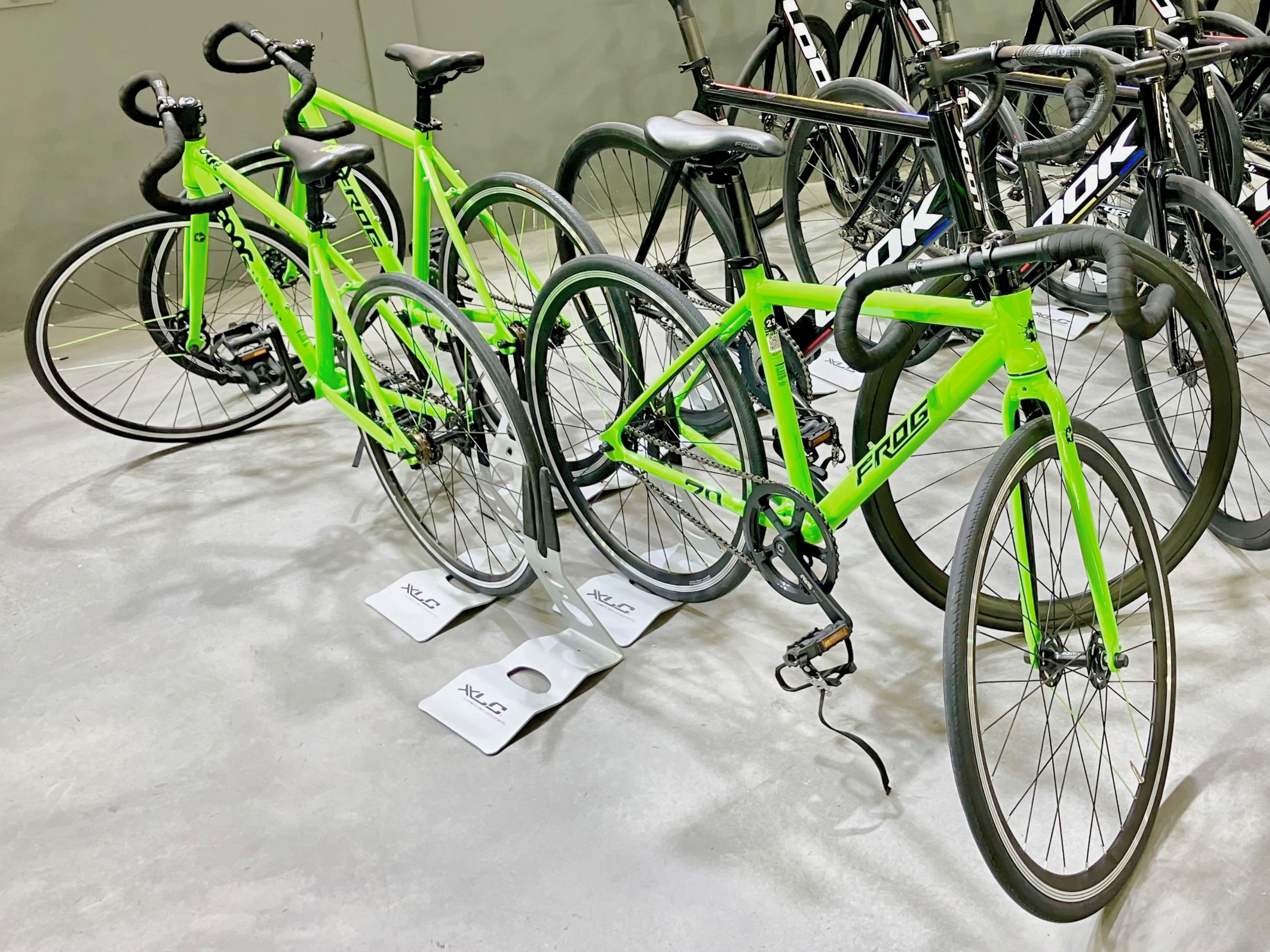
- Three Frog Bikes bicycles at the Vélodrome de Bretagne
- Type: Subsidiary
- Industry: Bicycles
- Founded: 2013
- Founder: Jerry and Shelley Lawson
- Headquarters: Ascot, Berkshire, United Kingdom
- Area served: UK, United States, Canada Europe
- Products: Bicycle and Related Components
- Owner: Frasers Group
- Website: Frog Bikes

Frog Bikes is a UK bicycle brand and former manufacturer. They specialise in producing bikes for children aged 1 to 14, including balance bikes. They use the motto "the lightweight kids' bike". The business was started by Jerry Lawson with his wife Shelley Lawson in 2013 with their head office in Ascot and a factory based in the South Wales town of Pontypool.

They started manufacturing in the UK in 2016 moving production back from China to improve lead times and quality. Frog bikes frames, forks and most components are made in Asia with the imported parts being assembled into complete bikes in Wales. The product achieved Made in the UK status and 'hand-built' marketing through the level of assembly including wheel building.

Frog Bikes received support and funding from the Welsh Government and received the Queens Award for Enterprise. In 2018 they won Manufacturer of the Year at the 'Made in the UK' awards.

In April 2026, Frog Bikes' brand and intellectual property was rescued from the manufacturer's administration by Frasers Group.

== Reception ==
The Frog 52 was listed by Wired Magazine as the best kids bike for 'all-round value' in a 2018 article that commented on their reputation for "quality do-it-all starter bikes".

Prince Louis rode one of the bikes to nursery on his first day in April 2021.
