= Fire Trap =

Fire Trap or similar terms may refer to:

- The Fire Trap, a 1935 crime drama film about an insurance investigator pursuing arsonists
- Firetrap, a British clothing company
- Firetrap (Transformers), a Transformers character
