= Sweatshop (disambiguation) =

A sweatshop is a working environment with very difficult conditions.

Sweatshop may also refer to:

- Game sweatshop, a business concerned with exploiting the need for in-game resources in massively multiplayer online role-playing games
- Sweatshop, a 2004 adult film directed by Brad Armstrong
- sweatshop (retailer), a chain of sports clothing shops in the UK
- Sweatshop (album), a 1990 album by jazz guitarist Joe Morris
- Sweatshop (film), a 2009 horror film

== See also ==
- Swet Shop Boys, an Indian hip hop group
