= Bridgewater, Banbridge =

Retail and business development in County Down, Northern Ireland

Coordinates: 54°19′51.1″N 6°16′36″W

Bridgewater
- Shopping outlet and retail park
- Location within the United Kingdom
- Country: United Kingdom
- Division: Northern Ireland
- County: County Down
- Built: 2004; 22 years ago

Bridgewater (formerly known as The Outlet Park) is a major retail and business development in County Down, Northern Ireland, near Banbridge. It consists of a shopping outlet, retail park, drive-thru units and petrol stations.

The Boulevard
- Location: Banbridge, County Down, Northern Ireland
- Opened: 2007; 19 years ago
- Previous names: The Outlet (2007–2018)
- Owner: Frasers Group
- Num. of stores: 77
- Num. of anchor tenants: 2
- Floors: 1
- Website: the-boulevard.co.uk

== History ==
=== The Boulevard ===
The Boulevard opened in 2007 as The Outlet. The shopping outlet is a home to discount outlets for big-name fashion retailers. The site was empty and struggled with footfall, with only a third of its units filled.

In 2016, The Outlet was acquired by Tristan Capital Partners and Lotus Property for more than £40m from its previous owner Ulster Bank, who acquired it from original owners GML Estates and Land Securities in 2011. Tristan and Lotus invested in the struggling site to become one of the biggest leisure and shopping destinations in Northern Ireland. The investment included opening a 8 screen Omniplex cinema, a McDonald's drive-thru restaurant and an implementation of a glass roof. The Outlet was rebranded to The Boulevard in 2018.

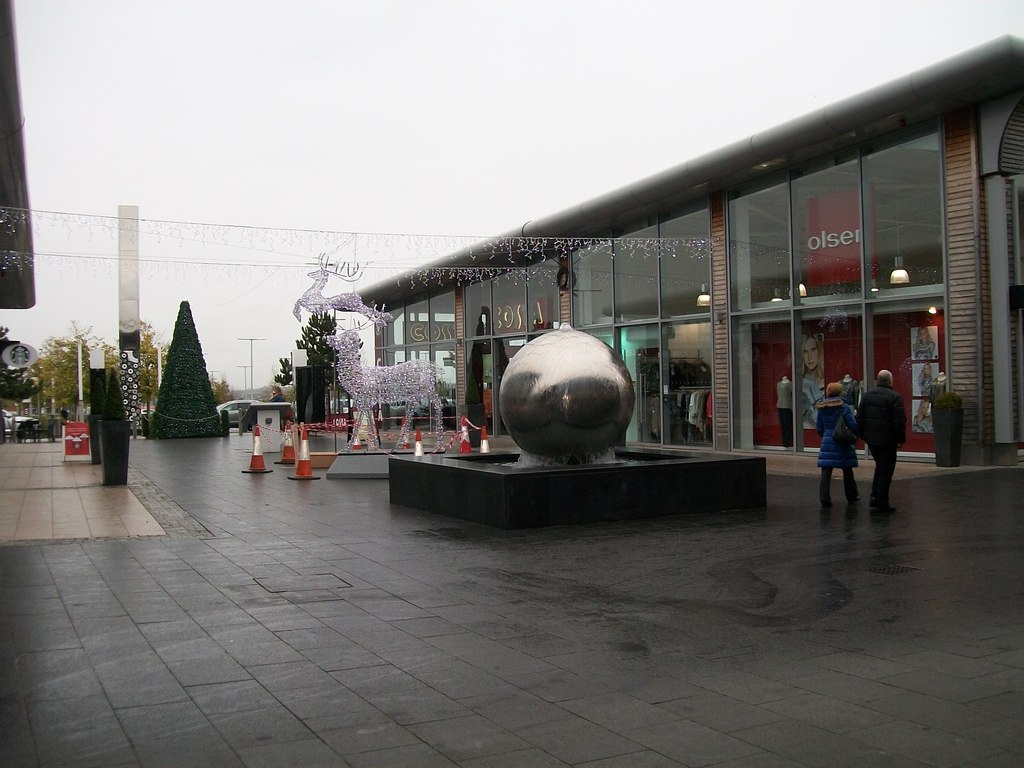
The Boulevard (then called The Outlet) in December 2009

In 2024, another investment was announced, with a Hollywood Bowl opening (the 2nd one in Northern Ireland) and an expansion of the area close to the Omniplex cinema, which will be redeveloped into a food and entertainment quarter. The development is expected to be finished by late 2026.

In June 2026, The Boulevard was acquired by Frasers Group after 10 years of Lotus and Tristan ownership, Frasers intends to invest in the shopping outlet further.

=== Banbridge Retail Park ===
In 2014, the Bridgewater (then called The Outlet Park) development began to expand, with a new Tesco store opening, this site would later become Banbridge Retail Park when Home Bargains opened in 2016.

In 2020, a major expansion of the retail park was announced with 3 phases, The Range, Marks & Spencer and EZ Living Interiors were announced to be tenants of phase 1 of the expansion. M&S and The Range opened in 2022 while EZ Living opened in 2023.

In 2024, another expansion was announced which would serve as phase 2 and 3 respectively; 5 retail units, a garden centre and 3 restaurants were to be added to the retail park.

In 2025, one of the units and the garden centre were announced to be leased to retailer B&M, who wanted to expand their unit and the garden centre which would take up some of the parking from a Game of Thrones experience nearby, the 3 restaurants were announced to be drive-thru units.

=== The Gateway ===
The Bridgewater development expanded further in 2019 with the opening of a KFC restaurant behind The Boulevard, this area would be known as The Gateway. Like The Boulevard, the area was owned by Tristan Capital Partners and Lotus Property but is now owned by Frasers Group.

The area quickly expanded from 2023 to 2025, with a Go motorway service and coffee drive-thru, a Starbucks drive-thru and an electric car charging station powered by Fastned.
