= Universal Cycles =

British bicycle company

Universal Cycles, founded in Basildon, Essex, England, in 1977, is a supplier of bicycles and accessories. The company introduced the Silver Fox brand to the UK, and in 2001 acquired the mountain bike manufacturer Muddy Fox.

Since April 2009 Universal has operated as a majority-owned subsidiary of Sports Direct.
