= Thornback & Peel =

Thornback & Peel is an independent British Designer Brand, based in central London. Thornback & Peel is owned by Juliet Thornback and Delia Peel and was established in 2007. The brand now retails through their own Bloomsbury shop and their web store. They supply to John Lewis, Fortnum & Mason, Harrods, Le Bon Marche as well as other independent UK and international stockists. Collaborations include The Conran Shop, Brompton Bicycle, GOOP and sofa.com.

== History ==
Juliet Thornback and Delia Peel met in 2003. While continuing with their day jobs as florist and set designer respectively, they began their first collaboration, a small collection of hand printed clutch bags. They later set up a studio space at the Holborn based Cockpit Arts, a hub of designer-markers. In 2007 they established Thornback & Peel to create screen-printed home ware.

== Collections ==
Thornback and Peel produce two new collections a year, to accompany their core ranges, including their "Rabbit & Cabbage" motif.

== Collaborations ==
Thornback & Peel have worked on a number of collaborative projects with a range of interiors and fashion brands, including:

- Handkerchief boxes for Brompton Bicycle
- A range of kitchenware for SMUG, a lifestyle store in Islington, London
- Two collections of Handkerchief Boxes for Oliver Sweeney
- Hand printed linen for shoe makers, Carreducker
- A bespoke collection of tea towels for GOOP
- A range of printed fabric for furniture with Sofa.com
- A range of kitchenware for WholeFoods Market
- Two collections of kitchenware for The Conran Shop
- A collection of tea towels, bags and handkerchief to celebrate the Festival of Britain for the South Bank Centre
