= Maxfli =

Brand of sports equipment

- Maxfli golf ball from 2002
- Product type: Golf equipment (balls, bags, gloves, accessories)
- Current owner: Dick's Sporting Goods
- Country: United States
- Introduced: 1910; 116 years ago
- Markets: Sports equipment
- Website: maxfli.com

Maxfli is a brand of sports equipment, most recognized for its golf balls, currently owned by Dick's Sporting Goods. Dick's purchased the brand from TaylorMade Golf on February 11, 2008; however, the Noodle trademark and all golf ball patents remained with TMaG.

Golf products currently commercialized under the "Maxfli" brand include bags, gloves, and accessories such as training aids and umbrellas.

Maxfli was previously owned by the Dunlop Slazenger group before its acquisition by TMaG in 2003. While under TMaG ownership, the brand underwent a change in focus from premium balls, such as Black Max and Red Max, to distance balls such as the Fire and the already successful Noodle, as TMaG looked to use its own TaylorMade brand in the high end golf ball market. The Maxfli brand and trademark was originally created by the sports division of the Dunlop Tire and Rubber Corporation, headquartered in Buffalo, New York.
