= Ebuyer =

English online retailer

- Logo used since 2021
- Type: Private
- Industry: Computers; Computer hardware Software; Electronics; Consumer goods Gadgets
- Founded: 1999; 27 years ago
- Founders: Paul Cusack; Mike Naylor; Steve Kay; Neeraj Patel; Adam Ashmore
- Headquarters: Howden, East Riding of Yorkshire, England
- Products: Computer hardware, software, peripherals, gaming, electronics, accessories, DVDs and more
- Revenue: £136.5 Million (2023)
- Number of employees: 190 (2023)
- Parent: Frasers Group
- Website: http://www.ebuyer.com/

Ebuyer is an electronic commerce retailer previously based in Howden, East Riding of Yorkshire, England. It is an independent online retailer of computer and electrical goods in the United Kingdom. The Ebuyer website was the 210th most visited site in the United Kingdom [Alexa.com ranking] and had 4 million registered customers.

A winding up petition was issued against the company by their landlord on 1 August 2025 and the company was acquired out of administration by Frasers Group on 13 August 2025.

== History ==
Ebuyer was founded in March 2000 in Sheffield by Paul Cusack, Mike Naylor, Steve Kay, Neeraj Patel, and Adam Ashmore – with startup capital of £250,000 from Cusack, its annual turnover was in excess of £220 million by September 2005. Stuart Carlisle was its managing director (CEO) from 2014 until resigning in 2015. Paul Cusack resigned in December 2006.

Ebuyer (UK) Limited was owned by The West Retail Group from 2004 to 2023. West Retail is also the parent company of Wren Kitchens and the ultimate controlling party is Malcolm Healey.

In April 2023, Ebuyer was reported to have been purchased from The West Retail Group by investor Mark Reed and Richard Marsden via Realtime Holdings Limited. Richard Marsden was appointed the CEO.

The financial results posted on 3 May 2024 on Companies House show that Ebuyer (UK) Ltd turnover for 2023 (Year Ended 31 December 2023) was £136.5m with a profit before tax of (£1.7m) (Actual loss for the year). The prior year revenue was £174.25m with a profit before tax of £109k.

The company was issued with a winding up petition by their landlord on 1 August 2025. Whilst there has been no official statement from the company, considerable media coverage has ensued with reports that staff were sent home early on 6 August 2025.

On 13 August 2025, Frasers Group acquired Ebuyer.

== Security ==
In July 2008, Gavin Brent, from Holywell in Flintshire, North Wales admitted stealing goods worth £20,000 from the firm before returning the goods, and demanding full refunds. Brent, whose suspicious transactions were spotted by Ebuyer's security team, went on to conduct an online campaign against the company and the investigation. This included menacing Ebuyer staff and a police officer from Brent's now-defunct blog.

== Barton Town F.C sponsorship ==
Ebuyer have been the official floodlight and short sponsor of Barton Town F.C. from Barton-upon-Humber.

== Controversy ==
During 2005 Ebuyer had significant customer service problems. Sheffield Trading Standards received 282 complaints about the company, and the customer service phone number had been removed from its website. After this, the firm promised to improve its service, and restored the customer service number to its site. Average daily telephone wait times are published.

On 28 November 2011, Ebuyer ran a £1 promotion via email, offering new deals on the hour until midnight. Ebuyer angered customers when their website was unable to handle the extra traffic, causing it to crash. When the website did work, many customers were emailed after successfully ordering and paying for items, only to be told they were out of stock. Many customers vented their anger at the company on their Facebook page, however Ebuyer ran a campaign on their customer forums in an attempt to counter the bad publicity.

In December 2013, Ebuyer posted pictures to Facebook of its staff wearing Christmas themed jumpers. However, a Facebook user named Phil spotted that one of the images contained a leaderboard in the background that suggested that Ebuyer staff were rated on the number of returns that they reject. Ebuyer responded to these accusations by stating that these were return merchandise authorizations avoided by providing technical advice.
