= Donnay =

Belgian sports equipment brand

Donnay Sports
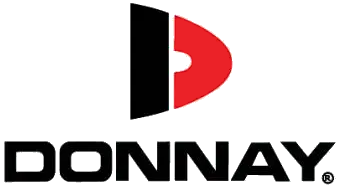

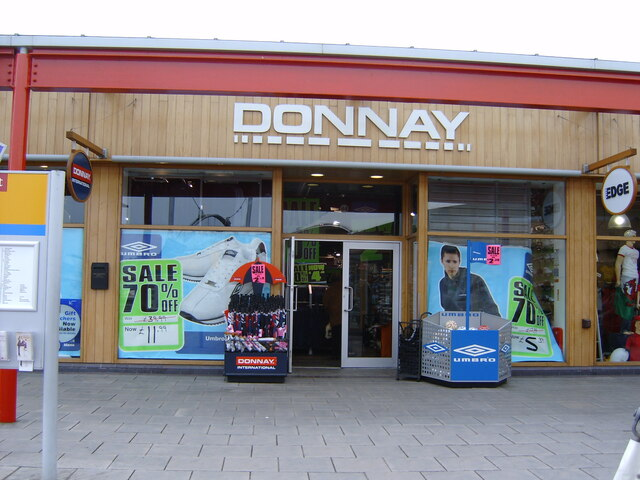
- Donnay shop, McArthur Glen
- Type: Private (1910–88)
- Industry: Sports equipment
- Founded: 1910
- Founder: Emile Donnay
- Defunct: 1988; 38 years ago
- Fate: Declared bankruptcy in 1988, acquired and becoming a brand
- Area served: Worldwide
- Products: Tennis rackets
- Owner: Frasers Group (1996–present)
- Website: donnay.com

Donnay Sports is a sports equipment brand currently owned by Frasers Group. The company was founded in 1910 by Emile Donnay and was based in Couvin, Belgium. Donnay manufactured wooden tennis rackets from 1934, and, by the 1970s, was the largest manufacturer of tennis rackets in the world. However, the company failed to adapt to the new market for graphite rackets, and entered administration in 1988. After a succession of owners, the brand was eventually sold to Sports Direct International, who continue to license the use of the brand worldwide.

Presently, Donnay commercialises tennis rackets, strings, and bags. Donnay rackets were used professionally in Europe by Björn Borg from 1975 until his retirement in 1983. Other professionals included Andre Agassi, Rod Laver, and Greg Rusedski.

== History ==
The company was founded in 1910 by Emile Donnay (1885–1972) as a wooden tool handle manufacturing co-operative with six employees. Emile Donnay had little education and a modest background. The company began to diversify into other wooden products, including a bow for archers, which continues to be reflected in the Donnay bow-shaped logo. In 1924, Donnay built premises in Couvin.

The company manufactured its first tennis rackets in 1934. In the early 1950s, the company won a valuable contract to produce tennis rackets for Wilson.

By 1969, Donnay was the world's largest manufacturer of tennis rackets. By the early 1970s, Donnay was producing two million rackets a year, 1.3 million of which were shipped to Wilson for distribution. Production suffered in 1973, when Wilson relocated its tennis racket production to Taiwan.

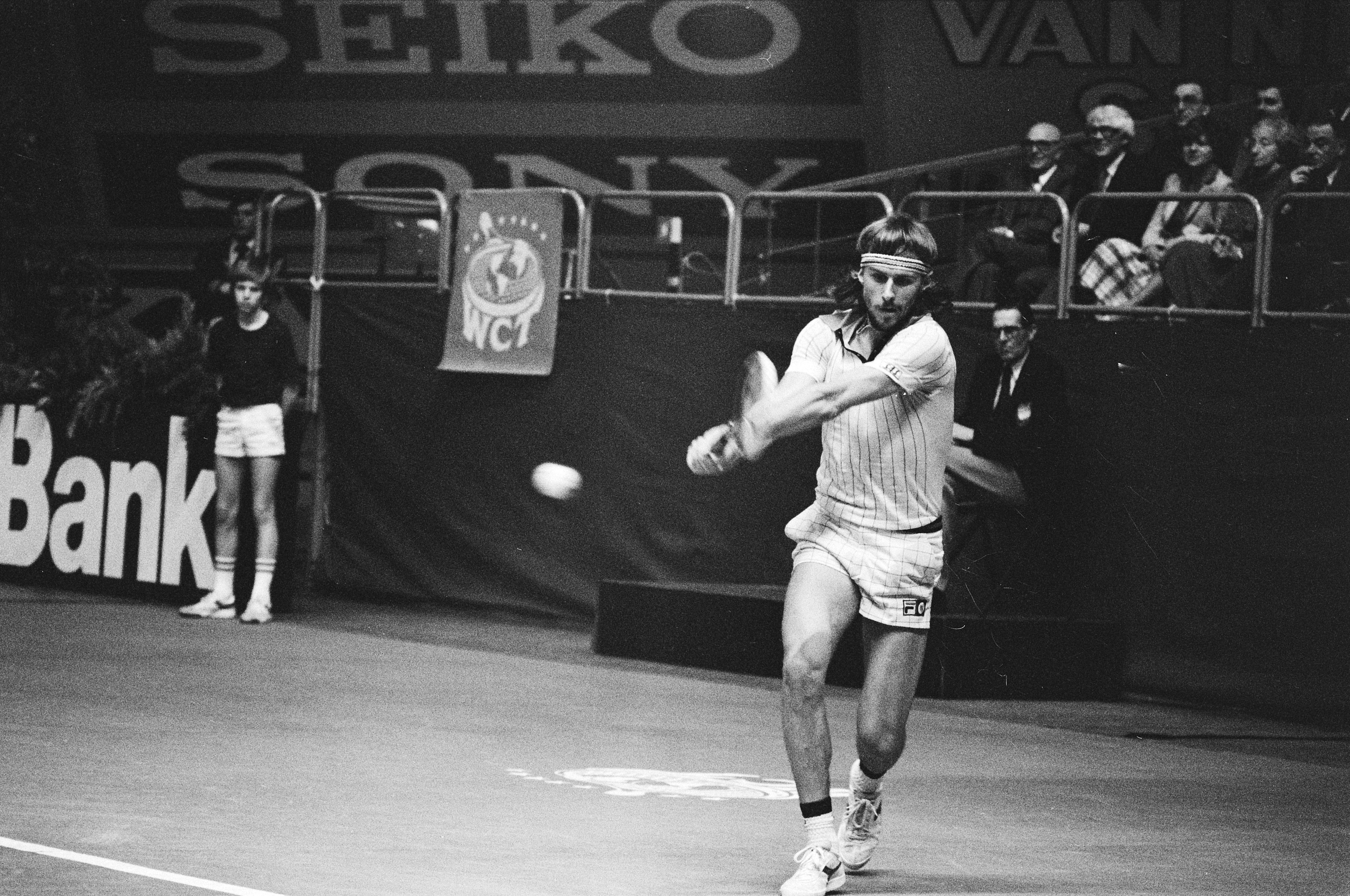
Björn Borg using a Donnay racket in the final of the 1979 ABN Tennis Tournament in Rotterdam

In 1981, Donnay produced 1.8 million rackets, almost all made from ash. The company failed to adapt to the changing market for the new lightweight graphite rackets. The company produced only 3,000 graphite rackets in 1980, instead concentrating on wood and aluminium rackets. The company continued to manufacture wooden rackets until 1984, by which time they were obsolete.

Buoyed by the success of signing up Björn Borg as a Donnay user, the company employed 600 people and manufactured around 1.5 million tennis rackets a year. In 1981, Donnay reported a turnover of 2.1 billion Belgian francs. Donnay's fortunes began to fade when Borg retired in 1983. Its success had been too closely aligned with Borg's success, and the company lost money for four years before entering administration in 1988 after amassing debts of $35 million. The company had apparently lacked the negotiation skills to attract another player of Borg's standing as a figurehead.

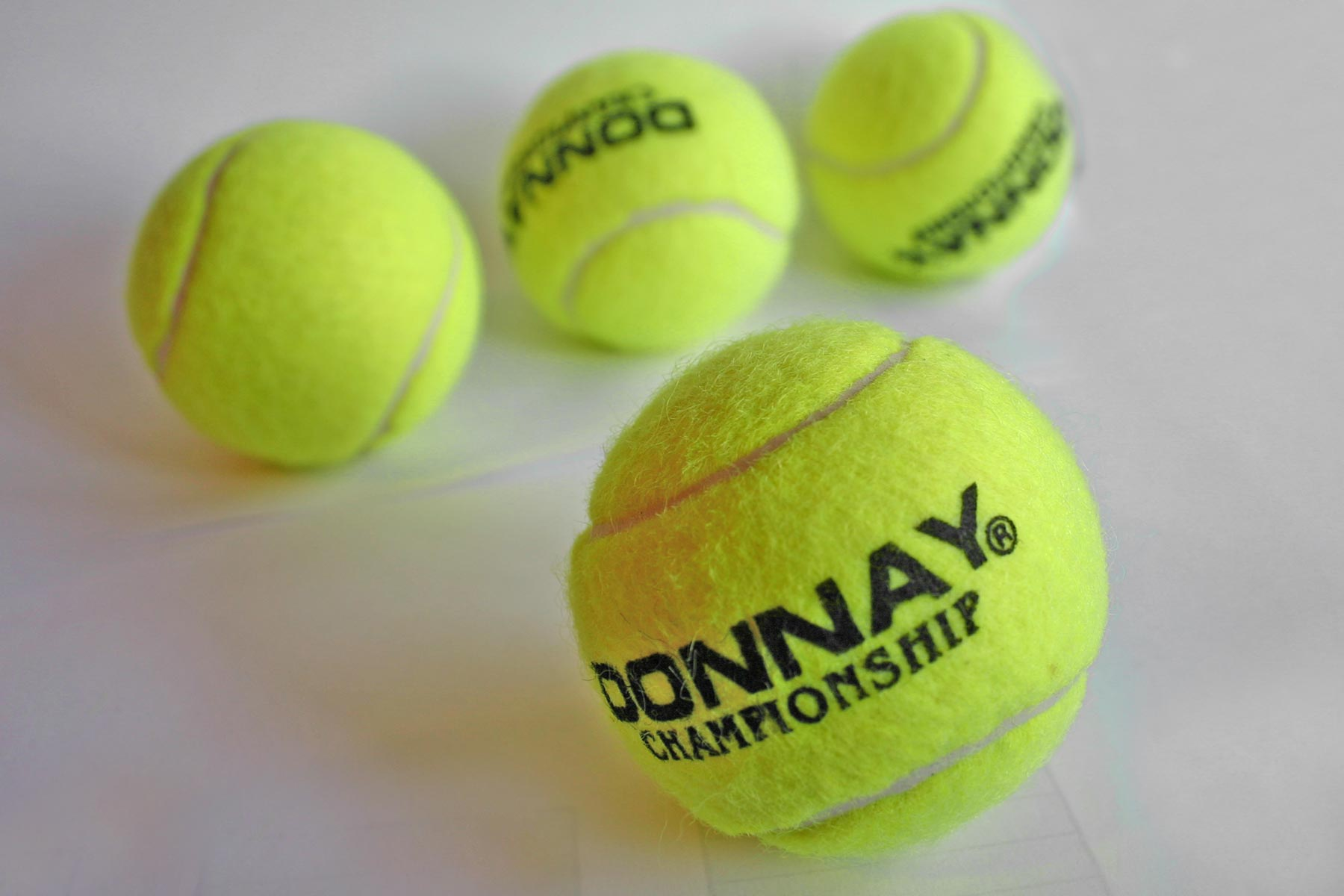
Donnay tennis balls

The Donnay family still controlled 55 percent of the company when it went bankrupt in 1988. The Walloon and Belgian governments held the remaining shares. The company was acquired by a group of investors, led by Bernard Tapie with a 51 percent stake, the Walloon government with 29 percent and Albert Frère with 20 percent. In 1991, Tapie sold his 58 percent stake in the company to the Walloon government for $16.2 million in order to finance the acquisition of Adidas shares. The government sold the factory to an Italian sports equipment manufacturer, Carbon Valley, and retained the brand rights. In December 1992, the Walloon government took ownership of the company in order to prevent it from entering administration again.

In 1996, Sports Direct International acquired the worldwide rights to the Donnay brand from the Walloon government for $3.9 million. At the time of the acquisition, production was based in Portugal, while 23 people remained employed at a distribution centre in Couvin. SportsDirect sells Donnay products as an in house brand and licences its production of Donnay branded products overseas. SportsDirect also separately licenses the brand to independent manufacturers and sellers of Donnay branded products, including tennis racquet production in the United States.

== Sponsorships ==
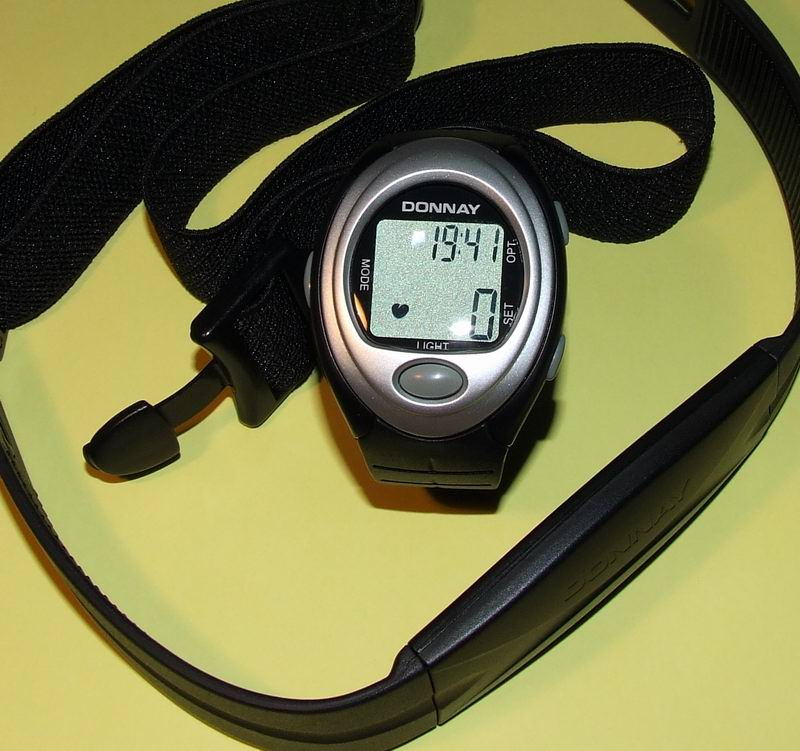
Donnay heart monitor

Initially, Donnay sponsored Belgian tennis players, and due to the amateur nature of the sport at the time, was only allowed to provide rackets and balls, and a small fee. Its first foreign sponsorship was with the French tennis player Yvon Petra. Rod Laver, Margaret Court, and Cliff Drysdale all played with Donnay rackets.

Donnay sponsored Björn Borg from 1975 to 1983, providing his racket. When Borg renewed the contract in 1979, it was worth $600,000 a year, plus royalties from Borg branded Donnay rackets.

Andre Agassi was signed to the Donnay brand between 1989 and 1992 for around $1 million a year. Henri Leconte and Greg Rusedski also used Donnay rackets.
