= Gul (watersports) =

Producer of water sports apparel

Gul Watersports
- Company type: Limited company
- Industry: Wholesale
- Founded: 1967
- Headquarters: Saint Columb, Cornwall, United Kingdom
- Key people: Dennis Cross (Founder); Nick Fox (Managing Director); Jack Knowles (Sales Manager); Grant Goodhew (Senior Technical Designer)
- Products: Surfing, sailing and kayaking equipment & apparel
- Number of employees: 50+
- Parent: Frasers Group
- Website: gul.com

Gul produces watersports apparel. Their products include wetsuits, jackets, bodyboards, buoyancy aids, and life jackets.

== History ==
Gul is credited with pioneering the first one-piece wetsuit in 1974/75.
