= Dunlop Slazenger =

British sports equipment brand

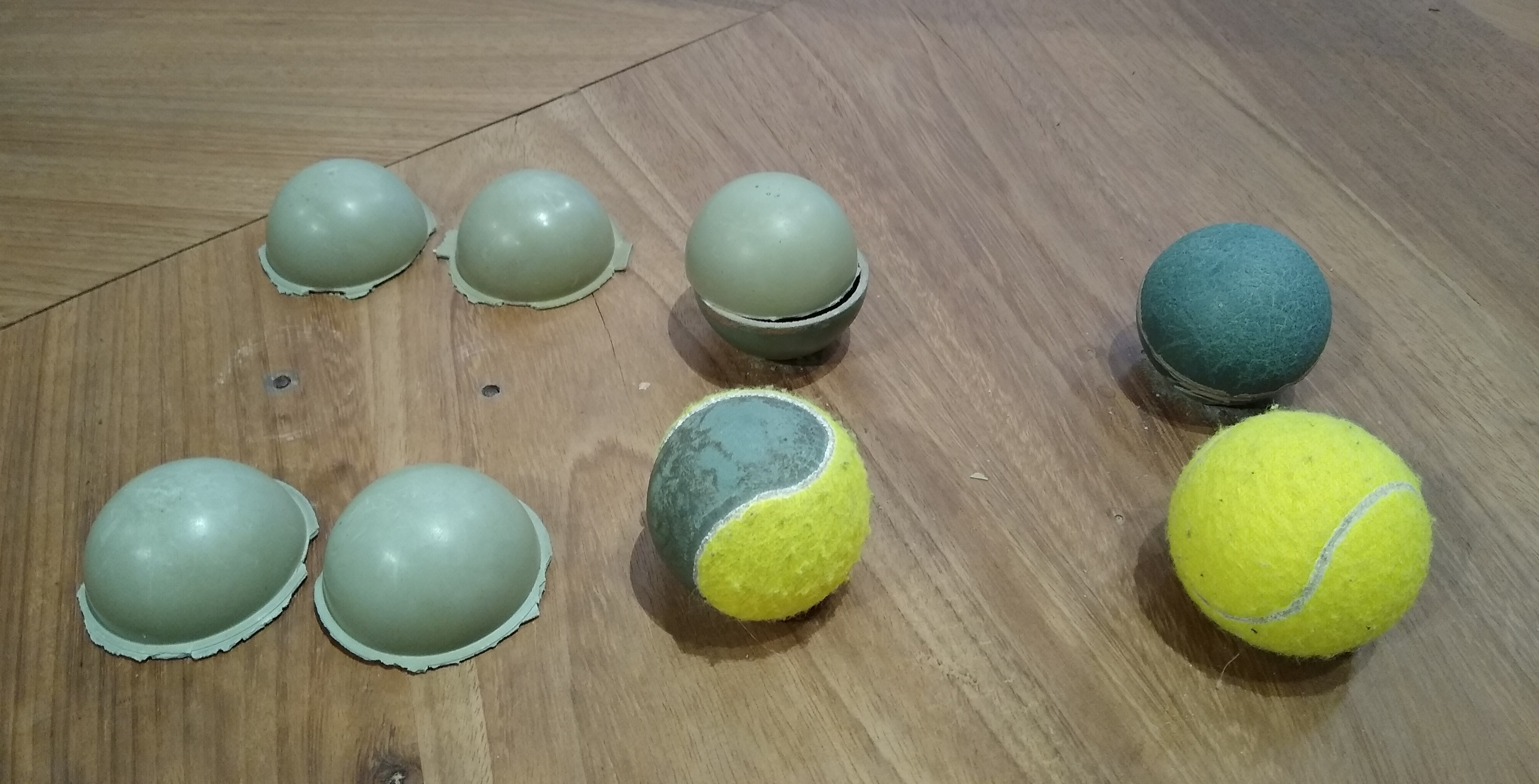
Tennis balls and parts manufactured by Dunlop Slazenger, on display at the London Design Museum

Dunlop Slazenger was a sports equipment manufacturing company formed by now-defunct BTR plc by consolidating the various sports brands acquired as part their take-over of Dunlop Holdings in 1985.

The company is most recognised for its involvement in golf, tennis, squash, and badminton through the Dunlop Sport, Slazenger, Maxfli and Carlton Sports brands.

== Overview ==
In 1996, the company was sold in a management buyout backed by private equity firm Cinven. This arrangement did not have a successful existence, and Dunlop Slazenger soon found itself being run by the banks, led by The Royal Bank of Scotland. Under the banks' management, TaylorMade-adidas Golf took up their option to purchase the Maxfli golf brand in 2004, following a previous licensing arrangement, and the rights to Slazenger Golf in North America were sold to the Slazenger Golf Products Company.

The remainder of Dunlop Slazenger was eventually sold to Sports Direct for £40 million in 2004. Since then Dunlop, Slazenger and other brands have been licensed or sold to other companies, notably Dunlop Sport being sold to Sumitomo Rubber Industries (SRI), a company of Sumitomo Group, for US$ 137.5 million in 2016–17.
