= Frasers Group =

British retail and real estate conglomerate

Frasers Group plc
- Formerly: Sports Direct International Limited (2006–2007); Sports Direct International plc (2007–2019)
- Type: Public
- Traded as: LSE: FRAS; FTSE 250 component
- ISIN: GBO0B1QH8P22
- Industry: Retail; Textile; Sports equipment; Footwear; Property; Cosmetics; Electronics; Luxury goods
- Founded: 2006; 20 years ago
- Founder: Mike Ashley
- Headquarters: Shirebrook, England; London, England
- Number of locations: 1500+ (2025)
- Key people: David Daly (chairman); Michael Murray (CEO); David Al-Mudallal (COO)
- Products: List: Sports equipment; Clothing, sportswear; Sneakers, shoes, boots; Cosmetics; Decorative objects; Electricals; Furniture; Gifts; Toys
- Services: Frasers Plus
- Revenue: ▲£5,245.5 million (2026)
- Operating income: ▼£386.3 million (2026)
- Net income: ▲£343.8 million (2026)
- Owner: Mike Ashley (73.30%)
- Number of employees: 30,000 (2026)
- Website: frasers.group

Frasers Group plc (formerly known as Sports Direct International plc) is a British retail, real estate, intellectual property and investment conglomerate, named after its ownership of the department store chain House of Fraser.

The company is best known for trading predominantly under the Sports Direct brand which operates both physical outlets and online. Other retailers owned by the company include Frasers, Flannels, Harvey Nichols, USC, GAME, Evans Cycles, Jack Wills and bespoke tailors Gieves & Hawkes. The company owns several sporting goods brands, including Everlast, Lonsdale, Slazenger and Karrimor. The group also expanded into operating fitness clubs, launching the Everlast Fitness Club chain in 2020. Since 2015, the group has been acquiring properties such as shopping centres and outlet parks.

Established in 1982 by Mike Ashley, the company is the United Kingdom's largest sports-goods retailer. The company's business model is one that operates under low margins. Ashley has continued to hold a majority stake in the business, and his holding has been 61.7 percent since October 2013. It is listed on the London Stock Exchange and it is a constituent of the FTSE 250 Index.

== History ==
=== Early history ===
Sports Direct was founded by Mike Ashley in 1982 as a single store in Maidenhead trading under the name of "Mike Ashley Sports".

=== Going public ===
In late November 2006, a number of business newspapers reported that Ashley was looking at an IPO of Sports World International. He hired Merrill Lynch, who valued the group at up to £2.5bn ahead of a possible flotation on the London Stock Exchange. The group debuted on the exchange on 27 February 2007.

=== Corporate finance and mergers ===
By December 2006, Sports Direct had built up a 29.4% stake in Blacks Leisure Group, the owner of Millets. In 2007 Ashley held talks with John Hargreaves, founder of Matalan on both taking a 25% stake in the troubled retail business and installing mezzanine floors in larger Matalan stores, on which SportsDirect.com outlets could be operated. In June 2007, the company acquired Everlast for £84 million.

By July 2008, Sports Direct was also holding a 12.3% holding in the John David Group, parent of JD Sports. The stake amounted to 11.9% of JD Sports in November 2013. Sports Direct formerly held 5% of Amer Sports. In 2012 Sports Direct International purchased rival retailer JJB's brand name, website, 20 stores and all of their stock in a deal for approximately £24m. The deal saved around 550 jobs.

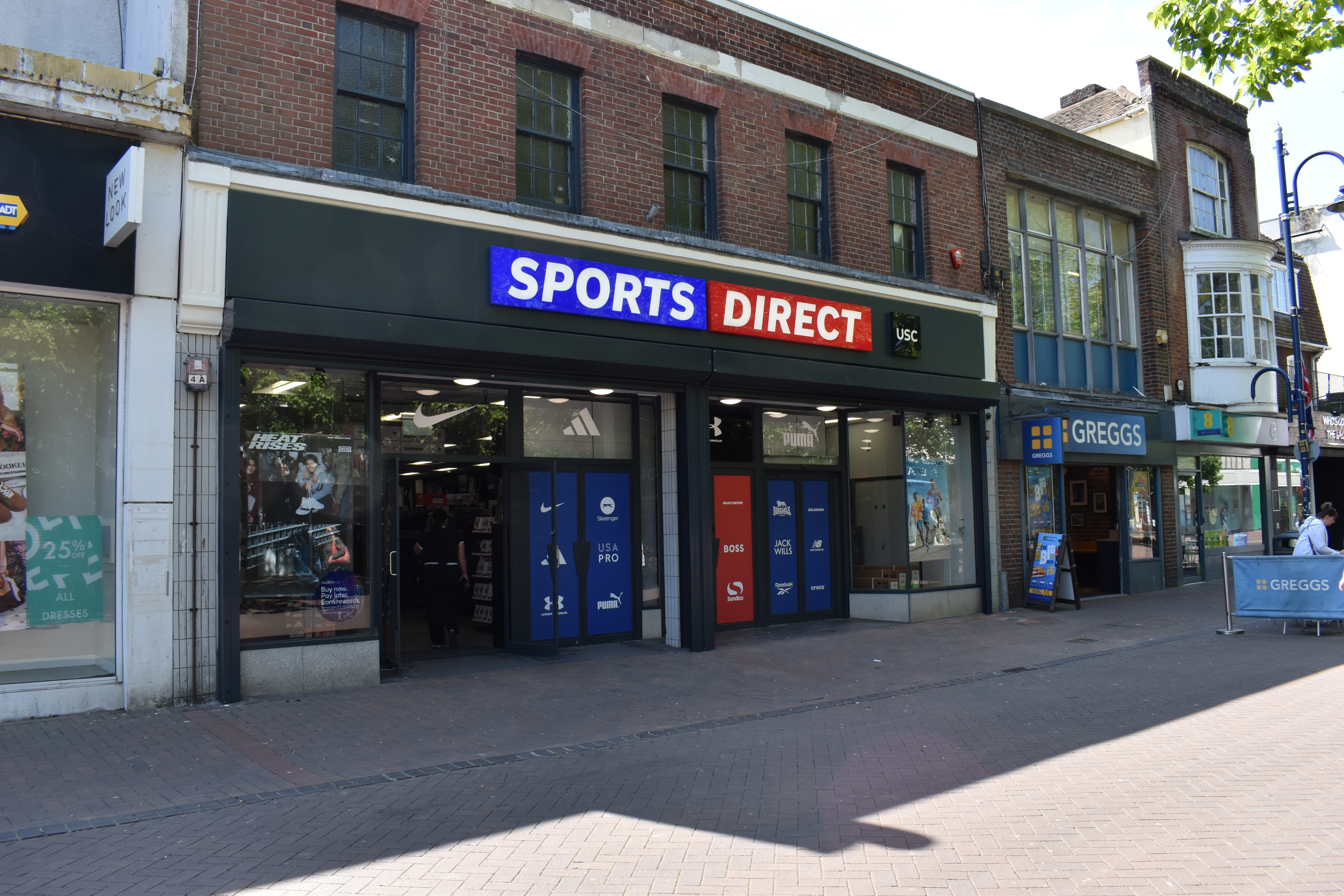
A Sports Direct store in Gosport. Sports Direct is the company's flagship brand.

In February 2013, after fashion retailer Republic went into administration, Sports Direct International bought 116 Republic stores, the brand name and the company's head office from the administrator for an undisclosed sum. In July 2013, more than 2,000 full-time staff were awarded around £70,000 each under the company's bonus share scheme. On 13 January 2014, Sports Direct bought 4.6% of Debenhams shares. The stock market purchase of 56.8 million shares (worth around £46m) was made without the prior knowledge of the Debenhams board. Sports Direct International stated at the time it intended to be a supportive share holder. The Debenhams board responded by stating they were open-minded with regard to exploring operational opportunities to improve its performance. Sports Direct International sold its shares on 16 January 2014, although they took out an option to buy further shares up to a total of 6.6%.

In December 2016, Sports Direct International agreed to sell the remaining international rights to its Dunlop brand to Sumitomo Rubber Industries for £112 million ($137.5 million). Sumitomo already own the rights to the brand in Japan, South Korea and Taiwan. The sale was due to be completed by May 2017. In July 2017, the company acquired a 26% stake in Game Digital.

=== Employee conditions and legal breaches ===
Between 2013 and 2014, ambulances were dispatched to Sports Direct HQ's facilities more than 80 times, including one concerning a woman who gave birth in the facility's bathroom. In October 2015, the chief executive of Sports Direct, David Forsey, was charged with a criminal offence for consultation failures over USC staff who only had 15 minutes notice of redundancy. In December 2015, an investigation by The Guardian found that the company fines staff for late clocking on, does not award overtime for late clocking off, relies on zero hour contracts, and regularly makes staff wait unpaid for a security check at the end of shifts. A union official suggested that these practices were illegal as they brought workers' earnings below the minimum wage. The company responded by saying there were unspecified inaccuracies in the reports. A representative from the charity ShareAction claimed that workers are "jeopardising their health" for fear of being dismissed while another shareholder said the company's reputation as an employer was "atrocious".

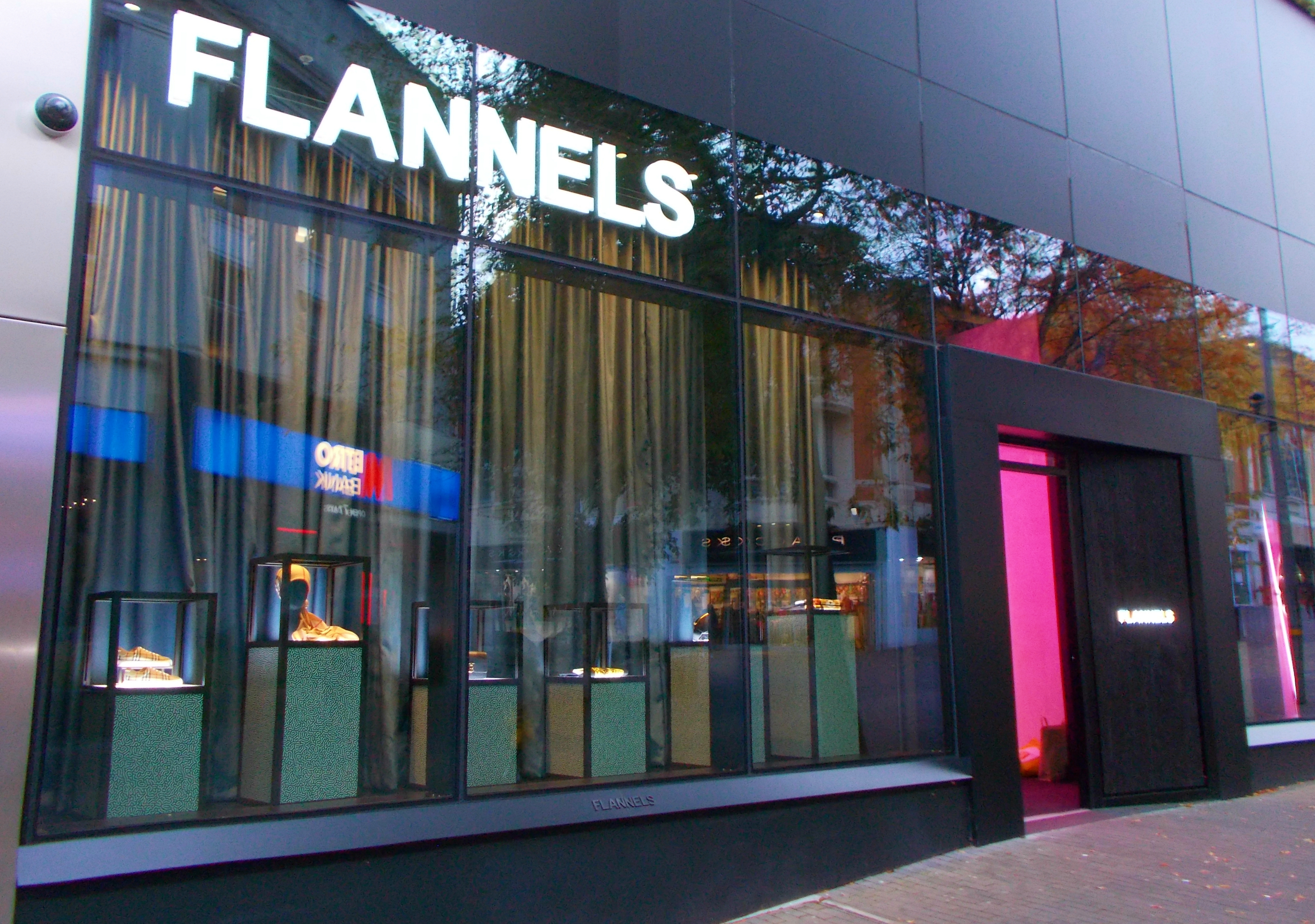
A Flannels store in Sutton, London. Flannels is one of the company's luxury brands.

Late in December 2015, Sports Direct announced a 15 pence per hour increase for staff currently receiving less than minimum wage, taking them above minimum wage, the annual cost of this was said in the announcement to be ~£10 Million (GBP); however it was immediately noted that £0.15p × 37.5 hours × 19,000 staff × 52 weeks = 5,557,500 (~£5.5 million), this and other factors resulted in many (including Unite) calling it a "PR Stunt". Workers on zero-hours contracts are not included in the rise and neither are those already paid more than minimum wage (management/supervisors etc.) therefore the 19,000 staff above is actually substantially fewer.

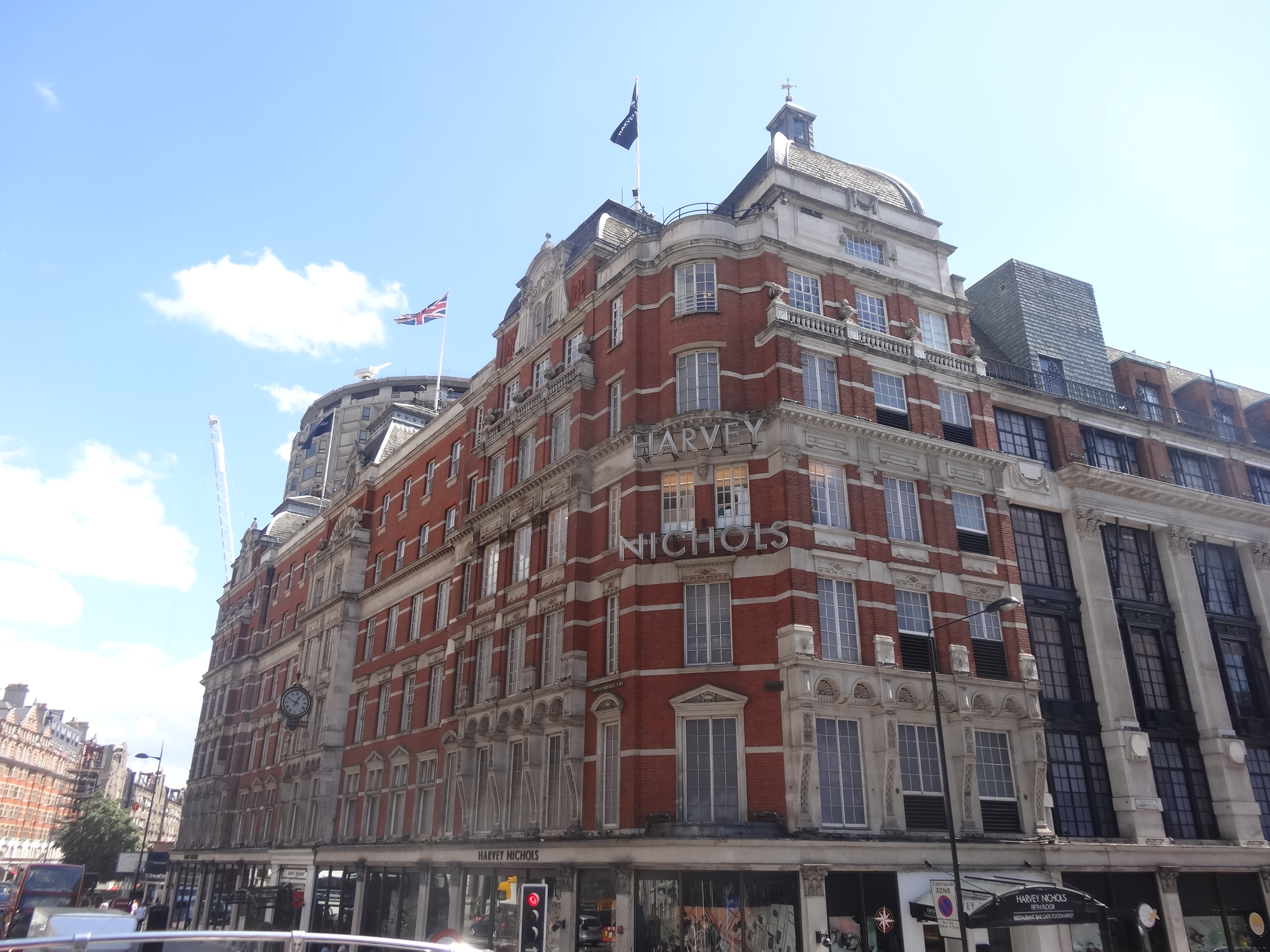
Harvey Nichols' flagship store in Knightsbridge

In August 2016, Sports Direct Int. admitted breaking the law and agreed to disburse unlawfully withheld wages totalling about £1m to the affected workers. As of March 2017, some Sports Direct workers were yet to receive backpay for their time worked, because of a disagreement regarding how contracts changing between employment agencies should be handled. In November 2016, six MPs from the Business and Skills Committee visited Sports Direct, and reported that while there, Sports Direct attempted to place them under surveillance. In February 2017, it was reported that Sports Direct had failed to inform its workforce of a data breach of their personal information after an attacker gained access to its internal systems in September 2016. The Information Commissioner's Office stated it was aware of "an incident from 2016 involving Sports Direct" and would "be making enquiries."

=== Recent history ===
The company announced on 16 December 2019 that it would change its name from Sports Direct International plc to Frasers Group plc effective from 17 December 2019.

It was announced in September 2021 that Michael Murray was to be the incoming CEO of Frasers Group, taking over Ashley's role, in May 2022.

Former Sports Direct International logo

In July 2022, chief operating officer David Al-Mudallal announced in a memo that the company will stop allowing its office staff to work from home on Fridays, as had been practice for the last few years. The reason behind this decision was that many workers did not take working from home seriously enough and were often non-contactable.

In September 2024, the company opened a new concept store Frasers replacing the outgoing House of Fraser brand in Sheffield which includes a Sports Direct, USC, Game, Evans Cycles and Sofa.com.

== Frasers Plus ==
"Frasers Plus" logo, used for Frasers' finance service and properties

In 2023, Frasers Group CEO Michael Murray announced the group would launch a flexible payment service called Frasers Plus. The service would allow customers to buy now, pay later and earn points for paying through the service.

The service is provided using technology developed by fintech startup Tymit and credit provided by Frasers Group Financial Services Limited.

Frasers Plus is available in the United Kingdom and can be used in store and online at retailers such as House of Fraser, USC, Flannels, Jack Wills, Sports Direct, Myprotein and more.

In December 2025, Frasers Group started using the Frasers Plus brand on its shopping centres and other properties, with Luton Point rebranding to "Frasers Plus Luton". Its acquired outlets from the McArthurGlen Group also rebranded under the brand.

== Acquisitions ==
=== Dunlop ===
In February 2004, the company acquired Dunlop Slazenger for around £40 million, which included the Dunlop, Slazenger and Carlton brands.

The brands themselves are an increasingly important part of the business, and Sports World International made £10 million, from selling the intellectual-property rights to the Slazenger Golf brand to arch-rival JJB in 2005.

In 2016, Sumitomo Rubber Industries, a global tyre, sports goods, and industrial rubber products manufacturing company based in Kobe, Japan, filed for regulatory approval before the Philippine Competition Commission in connection with its planned acquisition of Dunlop-related wholesale, manufacturing, and licensing business from Sports Direct International.

Sumitomo Rubber intended to acquire the entire issued share capital of Dunlop Brands Limited, Dunlop Slazenger 1902 Limited, and Dunlop Australia Limited, and the Dunlop-related business of Dunlop Sports Group Americas, Inc. which are subsidiaries of Sports World International. The Philippine Competition Commission approved the regulatory filing for the said acquisition. The acquisition allowed Sumitomo Rubber to consolidate the Dunlop brand across various products including sports goods worldwide.

=== Other acquisitions and closures ===
In March 2004, Sports World International acquired outdoor gear manufacturer Karrimor for a reported £5 million.

In August 2005, Sports World International took a £9 million stake and signed a lucrative long-term deal in with troubled brand Umbro, which was subsequently sold to Nike.

In 2006, Sports World International acquired Kangol for an estimated £12 million.

In 2012, JJB Sports fell into administration and it was announced that Sports Direct International had purchased parts of the sports good retailers assets including 20 stores, the brand, and its website for £28.3 million.

In July 2012, Sports Direct International purchased a 51% stake in retailer Flannels.

In February 2013, Republic entered administration, and was purchased by Sports Direct International. Republic was merged into Sports Direct's USC brand.

On 10 August 2018, the House of Fraser entered administration. Later that day, Sports Direct International agreed to buy all House of Fraser UK stores, the House of Fraser brand, and all of the stock in the business for £90 million in cash. Prior to the company entering administration, Sports Direct's Mike Ashley held an 11% stake in the company.

On 30 October 2018, Evans Cycles was purchased by Sports Direct International in a pre-pack administration deal.

In February 2019, the group acquired Sofa.com for a nominal sum.

On 5 August 2019, Sports Direct International purchased Jack Wills out of administration for £12.7 million after winning a competition against Edinburgh Woollen Mill.

On 24 August 2020, it was announced that Frasers Group would buy "certain" assets from DW Sports Fitness for £37m, but would not be using the firm's brand name. Also in August 2020, during the COVID-19 pandemic, Ashley threatened landlords with House of Fraser store closures.

In December 2020, Debenhams announced it was going into liquidation, putting 12,000 jobs in 124 UK stores at risk unless the administrators could find buyers for all or parts of the business. Frasers Group was reported to be in talks to acquire Debenhams, though it was later reported that Ashley was mainly interested in using empty Debenhams stores to expand his other chains, including House of Fraser, Sports Direct and Flannels; taking 'vacant possession' would avoid redundancy costs for existing staff.

In January 2021, it was announced that the Jenners House of Fraser store in Edinburgh was closing for good and 200 jobs would be lost. In February, Frasers offloaded their 25% stake in French Connection.

In April 2021, the group announced it had doubled the hit it expects to take from the coronavirus pandemic to £200 million.

In February 2022, the group announced it had purchased some of the assets of the Studio Retail Group from administration. In May, Frasers Group sold their stakes in Bob's Stores and Eastern Mountain Sports.

On 1 June 2022, it was revealed that the group had bought the intellectual property of Missguided and its sister brand Mennace for about £20 million, after they went into administration the previous day.

In November 2022, it was announced Frasers Group had acquired one of London's oldest bespoke tailors, Gieves & Hawkes.

In June 2023, it was announced that Frasers Group had acquired a stake of 9% in ASOS, 9% in Currys and 5% in Boohoo.com. It had also acquired a stake of 21% in AO World. These holdings increased during the year.

In December 2023, the company acquired Matches Fashion, a luxury ecommerce fashion retailer, for £52 million from Apax Partners. On 7 March 2024, the Group said that Matches would go into administration after continually missing its business plan targets.

In April 2024, it was announced Frasers Group had agreed to acquire the Dutch sports retailer, Twin Sport.

In September 2024, Frasers Group made a takeover approach for luxury handbag maker Mulberry. The brand already held a 37% stake in the company However, the company confirmed that it would not make a bid for Mulberry in October, and then began making moves to install Mike Ashley as Director and CEO of Boohoo Group.

On 12 August 2025, the company acquired UK online electronics retailer, EBuyer after it fell into administration earlier in the month.

Frasers Group acquired a majority stake in American multi-brand boutique retailer The Webster, with founder and CEO Laure Hériard Dubreuil retaining a minority shareholding, in October 2025. It was confirmed that the brand would operate as a stand-alone business within the Flannels luxury division.

In November 2025, Frasers Group agreed to acquire 78 stores from Austrian sporting goods chain Hervis Sports, 29 in Hungary and 49 in Romania.

In March 2026, Frasers Group took a stake of almost 6% in Puma, becoming its second-largest shareholder.

In June 2026, Frasers Group made a €1.98bn takeover bid for Hugo Boss, but the German designer fashion company rejected the bid saying it undervalued the business. In August 2026, Frasers increased its stake in Hugo Boss to 48%. In October 2026, Frasers made Hugo Boss a subsidiary by increasing its stake to over 50%.

In August 2026, the group purchased most assets of department store chain Harvey Nichols, including most of its stores, its international presence and its headquarters, but not its store in Dublin or the OXO Tower restaurant.

== Operations ==
The company's operations include:

=== Retailers ===
==== General retailers ====
- 18montrose
- Brandmax
- Evans Cycles
- Flannels (Note: Acquired in full in 2017)
- Game (UK and Ireland only)
- Gelert
- Getthelabel
- Gieves & Hawkes
- Harvey Nichols
- House of Fraser/Frasers (flagship)
- Jack Wills
- Lillywhites
- Sofa.com
- Sports Direct (flagship) (Note: High street and internet retailer created from the merger of Sports Soccer and Sports World, and progressively rebranded as SportsDirect.com since 2007 after the company's domain name but has now switch back to just "SPORTS DIRECT".)
- Twin Sport
- USC
- The Webster

==== Online retailers ====
- Amara Living
- Ace
- Ebuyer
- MegaValue.com
- Studio
- Wiggle

==== Divested retailers ====
- Bike Clearance
- Dunlop (Note: Sold to SRI Sports Limited in 2016)
- Mennace
- Missguided (Note: Sold to Shein in 2023)
- Original Shoe Company (Note: Sold to JJB Sports in December 2007)
- Umbro (Note: Sold to Nike in 2007)

==== Defunct retailers ====
- Allsole
- Coggles
- Dixon Sports Ltd
- Field & Trek
- Gamestation
- Gilesports
- Hargreaves Sports
- Heatons
- JJB Sports
- MyBag
- PWP Sport
- ProBikeKit
- Republic (Note: Merged with USC)
- Scotts
- SheRunsHeRuns (Note: Merged with Sweatshop)
- Sneakerboy Australia
- Streetwise Sports
- Sweatshop (Note: Merged with SportsDirect.com)
- MatchesFashion (Note: Entered into administration)
- Tessuti
- Tri UK

=== Gyms ===
- Everlast Gyms (formerly Everlast Fitness Clubs)

=== Intellectual properties ===
- British Knights
- Carlton
- Donnay
- Everlast
- Firetrap
- Frog Bikes
- Gelert
- GoldDigga
- Grumpytoly Apparel
- Gul
- Hot Tuna
- Kangol
- Karrimor
- LA Gear
- Lonsdale
- Lovell Rugby
- Lovell Rackets
- Miso
- Miss Fiori
- Muddyfox
- Nevica
- No Fear
- Pretty Green
- Slazenger
- Sondico
- SoulCal
- USA Pro

=== Investments ===
- Currys plc (Note: 11% share in holding company)
- AO World (Note: 22.2% share in holding company)
- ASOS (Note: 12.6% share in holding company)
- Debenhams Group (Note: 26.86% share in holding company)
- Hugo Boss (Note: 50.08% share in holding company)
- Mulberry (Note: 37% share)
- Agent Provocateur (Note: ⅓ share in holding company)
- EAG (Eybl & Sports Experts) (Note: Austrian sports chain in a 51% stake was acquired for €40.5m (£34.6m) in May 2013)
- Sportland International Group (Note: Major Baltic sports retailer in which Sports Direct acquired a 60% stake in May 2013.)
- WIT Fitness (Note: Bought by Frasers Group out of administration in January 2024, a majority stake was then reacquired by the original founders in June 2024 leaving Frasers Group with a minority stake)

== Real estate ==
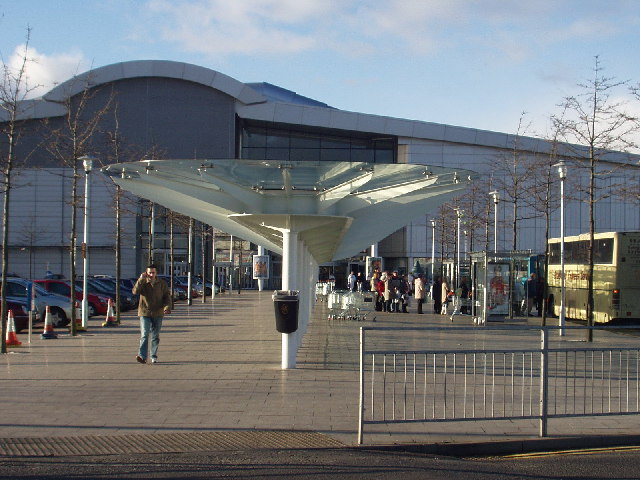
Braehead Shopping Centre is Frasers Group's' most valuable and largest out of their shopping centres and outlet parks.

Frasers Group has a major interest in shopping centres and outlet parks which is a major focus of their "Elevation Strategy", the interest started in 2015, when they acquired Donegal Place in Belfast, a small asset housing 4 units across 75,000 sq ft. Properties are operated and financed by Frasers Group Financial Services Limited and owned by FRS Estates Limited.

Frasers Group acquired their first large shopping centre in March 2023, acquiring The Mall in Luton for £58m, they rebranded the centre under the name Luton Point. A few days later, they acquired the Overgate Centre in Dundee for £30 million.

In November 2023, Frasers Group expanded into the shopping outlet market by acquiring the Junction 32 shopping outlet in Castleford from Landsec.

Within other acquisitions, Frasers Group acquired 1 million sq ft worth of shopping centres in October 2024, those being Princesshay in Exeter, Fremlin Walk in Maidstone and the Olympus Centre in Quedgeley.

In November 2025, the company acquired the Braehead Shopping Centre in Renfrewshire in a deal reported to be worth £220m, their largest shopping centre acquisition to date.

In December 2025, Frasers Group started using the Frasers Plus brand on its shopping centres and other properties, with Luton Point rebranding to "Frasers Plus Luton". Its acquired outlets from the McArthurGlen Group and Braehead Shopping Centre also rebranded under the brand. Frasers Group intends to use this brand to boost footfall from across the region.

In December 2025, Frasers Group began an aggressive expansion within the shopping outlet market with prime examples including acquiring 3 outlets from McArthurGlen Group and 2 outlets from Lotus Property. (Note: Frasers brought Swindon Designer Outlet in December 2025, with York Designer Outlet and East Midlands Designer Outlet following shortly after in April 2026.) By May 2026, the company claimed that they owned one fifth of the UK shopping outlet market.

=== Real estate properties ===
==== England ====
- Affinity Devon, Bideford
- Affinity Lancashire, Fleetwood
- Affinity Staffordshire, Talke Pits
- Cavendish Retail Park, Keighley
- Designer Outlet East Midlands, South Normanton
- Fremlin Walk, Maidstone
- Frenchgate Shopping Centre, Doncaster
- Designer Outlet Leeds, Castleford
- Frasers Plus Luton, Luton
- Princesshay, Exeter
- Robin Retail Park, Wigan
- Olympus Centre, Quedgeley
- St Nicholas Arcade, Lancaster
- Designer Outlet Swindon, Swindon
- Designer Outlet York, York

==== Northern Ireland ====
- Boucher Retail Park, Belfast
- The Boulevard, Banbridge
- Donegal Arcade, Belfast
- The Junction, Antrim
- Tower Centre, Ballymena

==== Scotland ====
- Affinity Sterling Mills, Tillicoultry
- Braehead Shopping Centre, Renfrewshire
- Overgate Centre, Dundee
- Waterfront Retail Park, Greenock

==== Divested properties ====
- Berryden Retail Park, Aberdeen
