= Muddyfox =

British bicycle manufacturer

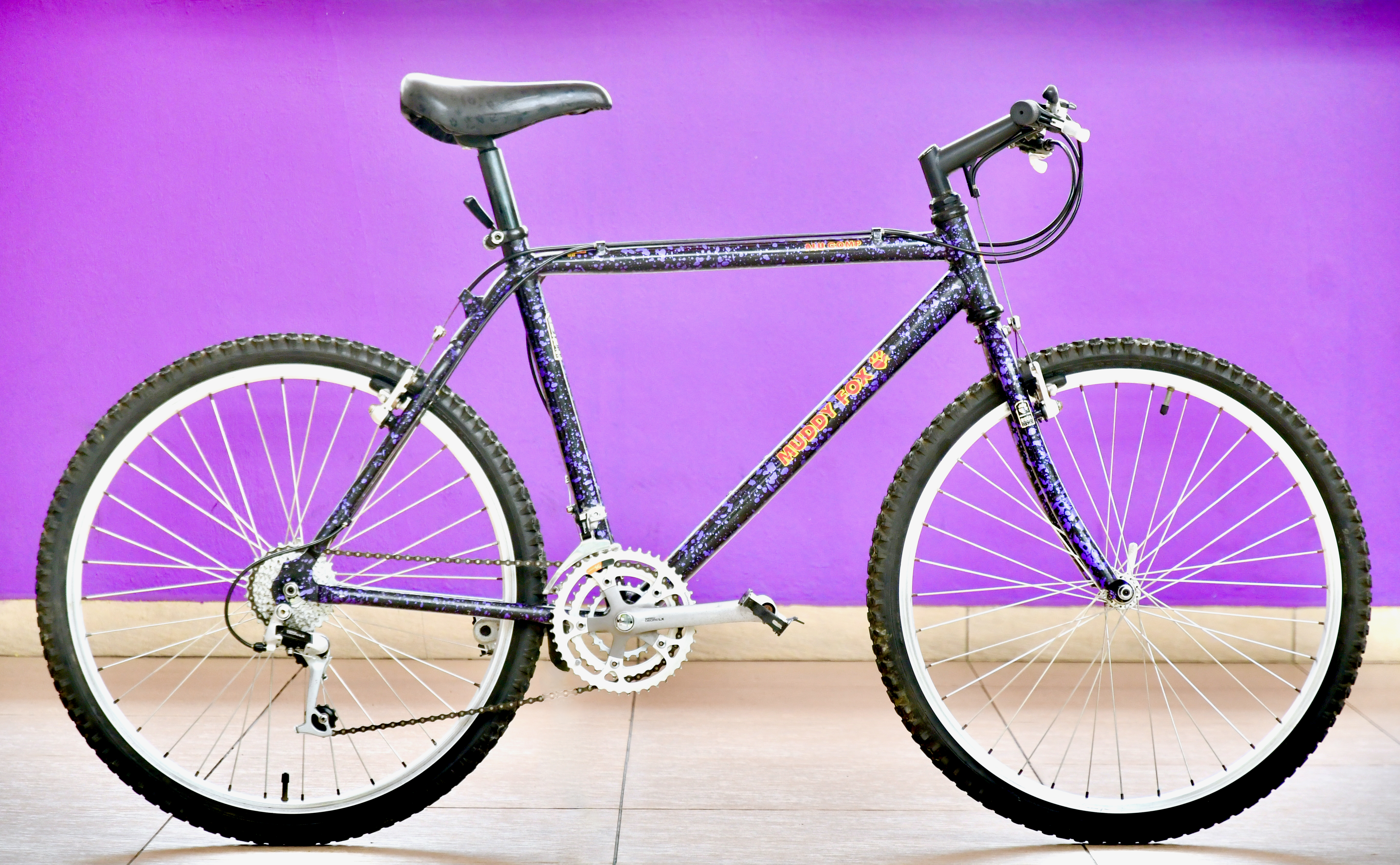
- 1992 Muddy Fox Alu Comp
- Type: Subsidiary
- Industry: Bicycle, textile, footwear
- Headquarters: Basildon, England
- Area served: United Kingdom
- Products: Bicycles
- Parent: Frasers Group
- Website: muddyfox.com

Muddyfox (formerly Muddy Fox) is a bicycle manufacturing company based in Basildon, England and has been a subsidiary of Frasers Group since 2009. The company specialises in mountain bikes, also producing road, hybrid, and BMX bikes. Muddyfox also has a clothing line for cycle sport that includes sportswear (jerseys, jackets, trousers, shorts, gloves). Protection gear and accessories include helmets, sunglasses, pumps and bicycle parts.

== History ==
Muddy Fox was founded by the serial entrepreneur Aristidis Hadjipetrou and Andrew Lawson after spotting a gap in the market in the UK for off-road bicycles with stronger frames and chunkier tyres which offered the user more versatility and range, following from the success of developers in America like Gary Fisher The company developed a successful marketing campaign, predominantly aimed at non-cyclists, based around a yellow background with black fox paw prints and were instrumental in reimagining the style of off-road cycling in the UK. Their innovative advertising included the world's first television commercial for a mountain bike, with print adverts focusing more on the outdoor riding locations, rather than the bike's appearance and specifications.

There had been a massive boom in bicycle sales in the 70's, so instead of entering this established market Ari and Drew exploited the emerging trend from the US of All Terrain Bikes (ATBs) - specifically the Mountain Bike. Despite being initially dismissed as a joke in the UK, and only selling 20 bikes in their first year, the company soon dominated the UK mountain bike scene, with a 50% market share by 1987, selling 20,000 units. Within two more years annual sales were approaching 100,000.

Initially manufactured in Japan by Araya Industrial, prices were high - around £500. It was always the intention to produce quality bikes at the high end of the market, however, moving production to Taiwan in 1984/85 made them more accessible with a price drop to £300. With the introduction of a more affordable model, mountain biking in the UK exploded with their most popular model, the Courier. Ironically, this was seen more as an urban icon than a serious off-roader, as reflected by its name - "Mountain Biking The untold British story" on YouTube.

By the early 1990s Muddy Fox had expanded to Europe, North America and Australasia and were moving into South America and the Middle East. Despite this huge success, a stock market crash brought financial trouble, eventually leading to a buyout. Video on YouTube

The company has been a brand of Universal Cycles since 2001, itself since 2009 a majority-owned subsidiary of Sports Direct International (current Frasers Group), and produces Silver Fox bicycles for bigbox retailers such as Argos.
