= Hot Tuna Clothing =

Australian surf and street clothing brand

Hot Tuna
- Company type: Private
- Traded as: Hot Tuna Clothing Industries Pty Ltd
- Industry: Retail
- Founded: 1969; 57 years ago
- Founders: Richard and Jo Meldrum
- Headquarters: Taree, Australia
- Area served: Worldwide
- Key people: Elle Macpherson (Former executive director)
- Products: surf, snow and streetwear clothing
- Parent: Frasers Group
- Website: www.hot-tuna.com

Hot Tuna is an Australian surf and street clothing brand. It was established in 1969. In 2012, the brand was acquired by Frasers Group for £1 million. Hot Tuna's executive chairman, Francis Ball, stepped down from his position after the sale.

== Logo ==
The company's main logo is a custom artistic print of a Piranha designed by Peter Fernley.

== Events Sponsored ==
Hot Tuna have sponsored surfing events such as the WQS Hot Tuna Central Coast Pro at Soldiers Beach on the Central Coast of New South Wales, the Hot Tuna Summer Classic at Gunnamatta Beach on the Victoria coastline in Australia and the Hot Tuna Summer of 69 at St Agnes in Cornwall, United Kingdom.
