= Carlton Sports =

British sports equipment manufacturer

- Company type: Subsidiary
- Industry: Sports equipment, textile, footwear
- Founded: 1946; 80 years ago
- Defunct: 1985; 41 years ago
- Fate: Acquired by BTR plc in 1985, becoming a brand
- Headquarters: England
- Products: Badminton rackets, shuttlecocks, sportswear, athletic shoes, table tennis equipment
- Owner: Dunlop Slazenger (1985–96); Cinven (1996–2004); Frasers Group (2004–present)
- Website: carltonsports.com

Carlton Sports is a British sports equipment brand, focused on badminton and table tennis. Originally established in 1946, Carlton is currently part of the Frasers Group (formerly, "Sports Direct International").

Badminton equipment by Carlton include rackets, shuttlecocks, sportswear, athletic shoes, and bags. For table tennis, Carlton offers rackets, balls, nets and post sets.

== Overview ==
The former Carlton company became a subsidiary group of Dunlop Slazenger International, located in Greenville, South Carolina. When DS was acquired by Sports International, Carlton was part of the group of brands traded.

Throughout its history the company has introduced a number of advances to the manufacture of badminton equipment, which ranked its as the first in innovations such as to make an injection molded shuttle, to design and make all-metal racquets, to use stainless steel in the manufacture of racquets, to design a flex system between shaft and handle, and to make a one-shot injection molded shuttle skirt.

The company claims to have sold more nylon shuttlecocks than any other company around the globe. English player and Olympic medalist Nathan Robertson was one of the players using Carlton equipment.
