= Everlast (brand) =

American sporting goods equipment brand

Everlast Worldwide Incorporated
- Type: Subsidiary
- Industry: Sports equipment Textile; Footwear
- Founded: 1910; 116 years ago in The Bronx, New York
- Founder: Jacob Golomb
- Area served: Worldwide
- Products: Boxing gloves and equipment, clothing, sneakers
- Parent: Frasers Group
- Website: everlast.com

Everlast Worldwide Incorporated is an American brand of sports equipment, focused on boxing, mixed martial arts and physical fitness, which markets its products worldwide. The company was founded in The Bronx and is currently based in Manhattan. In 2007, Everlast was acquired by the British retailing group Frasers Group.

Everlast manufactures a wide range of products for fight sports including boxing gloves, protective gear (head and body protectors, mouthguards, jockstraps, hand wraps), punching bags, punch mitts, boxing rings (and corner stools, canvas, ropes, corner cushions). The company also markets a clothing and footwear line including T-shirts, sleeveless shirts, hoodies, leggings, shorts, pants, compression garment, and sneakers.

== History ==
In 1910, 17-year-old Jacob Golomb, the son of a tailor and an avid swimmer, started the company as a manufacturer of swimwear designed to last longer than previously available swimsuits; he guaranteed his suits would last longer than one year, and named them "Everlast". He ran the company with his brothers Morris, and soon (1915) with Benjamin.

Everlast expanded into supplying a wide range of sports equipment. The company first produced boxing gear in 1917 after a young Jack Dempsey asked them to supply him with headgear that would last for more than 15 rounds. It subsequently sponsored Roberto Durán, Joe Frazier, Marvin Hagler, Larry Holmes, Sugar Ray Leonard, and in particular Muhammad Ali and became the most recognizable boxing brand.

Golomb died in the 1950s and was succeeded as head of the company by his son Daniel, who made the Everlast logo on the company's boxing gloves larger to increase visibility on television. Benjamin Golomb left Everlast and founded the Benlee Sporting Goods Mfg. Co. Ben Nadorf purchased 50% of Everlast Sports Mfg. Corp in 1958 and became sole owner in 1995. In 2000, the company was acquired by George Horowitz's Active Apparel Group, which had manufactured men's and women's sportswear under license for Everlast, and in 2007, Sports Direct acquired Everlast Worldwide.

The company has expanded its activities into MMA and has been awarded the World MMA Awards for Best Technical Equipment Brand five times, most recently in 2016.

Everlast boxing equipment is made in a factory in Moberly, Missouri; other products are manufactured outside the US by licensees. The company also made boxing equipment at a factory in the Port Morris section of the Bronx from the 1980s until 2003.

== UK gym chain ==
In 2020 Frasers Group bought a number of DW Sports Fitness (previously JJB Sports) locations out of administration, and started the Everlast Gyms chain. In late 2023 they had nearly 60 branches located across all four countries of the United Kingdom.

== See also ==
- Lonsdale (clothing)
- Mixed martial arts clothing
