= Sofa.com =

British furniture company

- Company type: Private (subsidiary)
- Industry: Retail (various)
- Founded: 2006
- Headquarters: London, England, UK
- Products: Sofas, Sofa Beds, Chairs, Beds
- Revenue: ▼£37.8 million (2022)
- Parent: Frasers Group (2019-)
- Website: www.sofa.com

Sofa.com is a UK-based company founded in 2006 whose primary business is selling sofas, sofabeds, chairs and beds online. It has 3 showrooms in London (Chelsea, Bankside and Islington) as well as Nottingham, Bath, Glasgow, Harrogate and Guildford. More recently, it has also opened concessions in some House of Fraser department stores. The company was purchased in January 2019 by Frasers Group (formerly Sports Direct International) for "a nominal sum".

== History ==
Sofa.com was founded by Pat Reeves and Rohan Blacker when they paid $215,000 for the domain name sofa.com. It was agreed that Reeves would buy the domain in cash and would meet the seller in New York to complete the transaction. On the day Reeves refused to pay cash and informed the seller he would only pay via wire transfer. The seller reluctantly agreed, and provided bank details, purportedly of the company he was employed by. In fact, the bank details were his own and $200,000 were transferred into his account in November 2005. He absconded to South America, but the money ran out ten months later and the seller was charged with theft greater than $10,000.

Blacker and Reeves sought a business venture that required fewer staff, fewer physical premises and a product with a higher basket value, and a long shelf life. They believed that furniture could be sold online with a promise of completely free returns if the customer, for whatever reason, rejected the goods. Sofa.com was launched in September 2006, with branding by Perry Haydn Taylor. It never holds sales, but sells its products all year round.

Sofa.com has appeared twice in the Sunday Times Fast Track 100, a list of the fastest-growing private companies in the UK, first in 2011 and again in 2012. Sofa.com sales grew from £572,000 in 2007 to £13.0m in the year ending February 2012. In February 2015, CBPE Capital acquired a majority stake in the business.

In January 2019, Sofa.com's stores and website operations were bought by at a "cut price" by UK billionaire and Sports Direct founder Mike Ashley.

== Products ==
Sofas are sofa.com’s primary product. They are designed in house and come in over 50 different styles ranging from traditional to more contemporary pieces. They are produced in their own factory and upholstered in a large range of fabrics bought directly from mills in Italy and Belgium. House fabrics consist of linen, cotton, velvet and corduroy. Sofa.com also sells sofabeds, chairs and footstools and in 2009 introduced a range of upholstered beds. Most of the sofas are constructed so that the arms are detachable or they split in two, to facilitate easier delivery to the customer. Sofa.com runs its own delivery team with vans that use the strapline ‘Sofa.com: I wonder what they do?’ and offsets its carbon output through the agency Forest Carbon by planting trees at a plot in Aberdeen shire.

== Design initiatives ==
In 2010 sofa.com launched its Design Lab initiative, supporting and working with British designers, artists and textile designers. The first collaboration was with St Jude’s, based in Norfolk and run by Simon and Angie Lewin. The second collaboration, with Thornback & Peel, launched in autumn 2012 and includes a range of armchairs, beds and ottomans.

In 2012 sofa.com also launched a nationwide Emerging Designers competition for upcoming British designers.
