= Slazenger =

British sports equipment brand

- Type: Subsidiary
- Industry: Sports equipment, textile, footwear
- Founded: 1881; 145 years ago
- Founder: Ralph and Albert Slazenger
- Headquarters: Shirebrook, Derbyshire, England, United Kingdom
- Area served: Worldwide
- Products: Racquets; Tennis equipment; Cricket equipment; Golf equipment; Apparel; Accessories
- Parent: Dunlop Rubber (1959–85); BTR plc (1985–99); Frasers Group (2004–present)
- Divisions: Slazenger Padel Clubs
- Website: slazenger.com

Slazenger (/ˈslæzəndʒər/) is a British sports equipment brand owned by Frasers Group plc (formerly Sports Direct). One of the world's oldest sport brands, the company was established as a sporting goods shop in 1881 by entrepreneurial brothers, Ralph and Albert Slazenger, in Cannon Street, London. Slazenger was acquired by Dunlop Rubber in 1959. Dunlop was acquired by BTR in 1985. Sports Direct acquired the business in 2004.

Frasers Group offers a range of products under the Slazenger label, including equipment for cricket, field hockey, golf, swimming, and tennis, and a clothing line. Slazenger produced the official football match ball for the 1966 FIFA World Cup.

Slazenger has the longest-running sporting sponsorship in the world, thanks to its association with the Wimbledon Tennis Championships, providing balls for the tournament since 1902.

== History ==
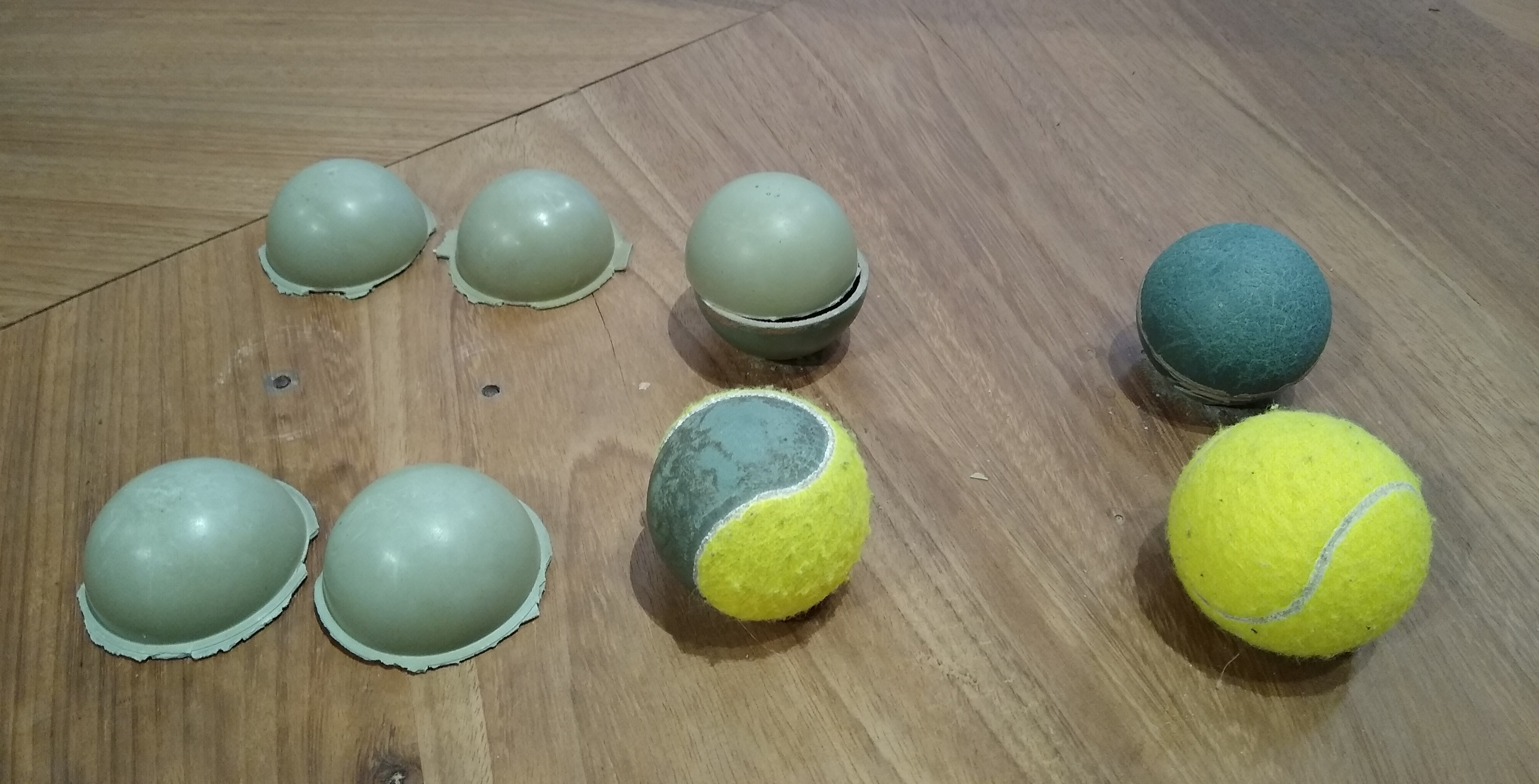
Tennis balls and parts manufactured by Dunlop Slazenger, on display at the Design Museum in London

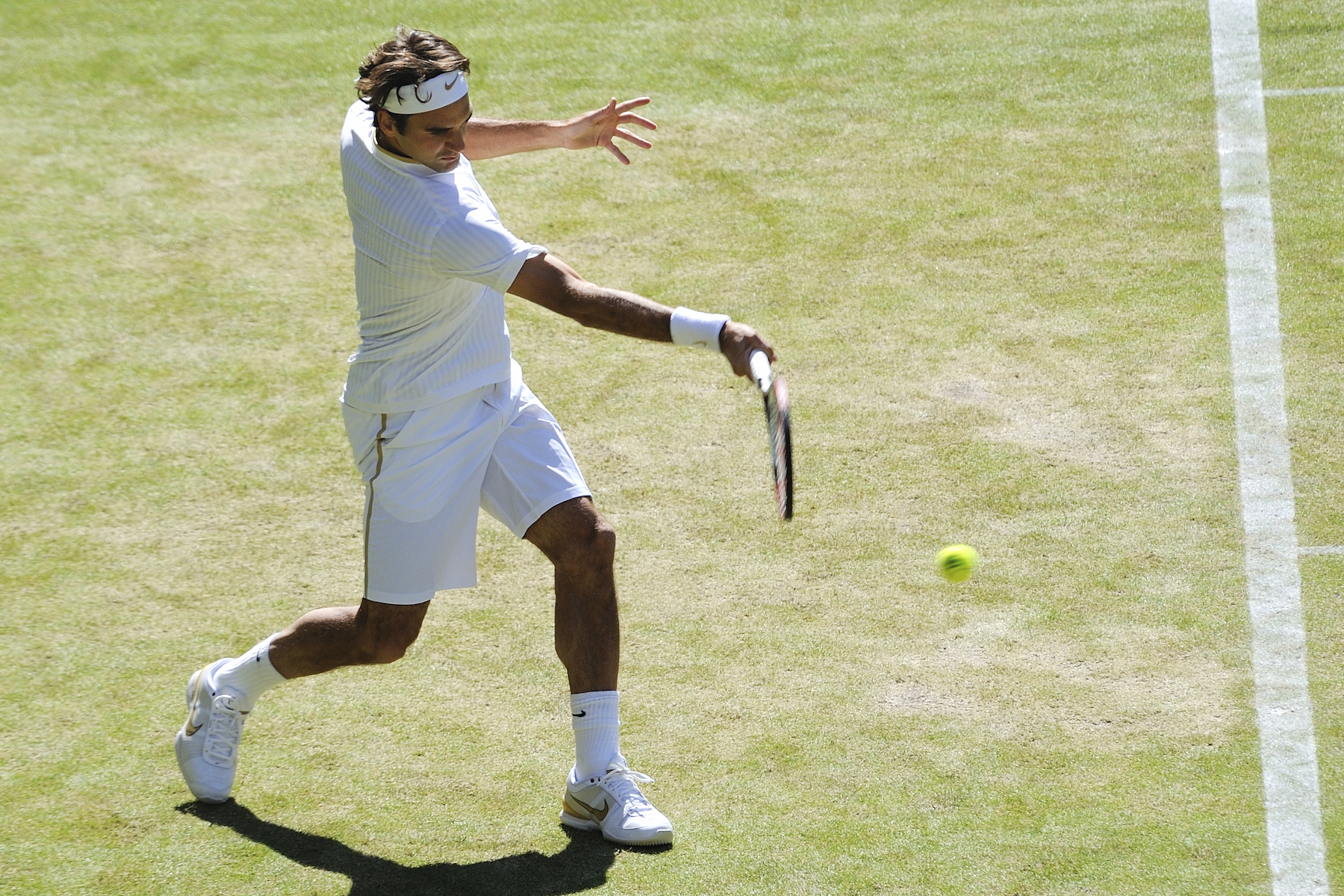
Roger Federer hitting a Slazenger tennis ball at Wimbledon. The brand has sponsored the tournament since 1902, the oldest sponsorship in sport.

In 1881, Ralph and Albert Slazenger, Jewish brothers from Manchester, established a shop in London's Cannon Street, selling rubber sporting goods. Slazenger quickly became a leading manufacturer of sporting equipment for golf and tennis. Four years after the All England Lawn Tennis and Croquet Club held its first-ever championships in 1877, Slazenger produced 'The New Game of Lawn Tennis' (tennis rackets and balls) complete in a box. In 1883, Slazenger filed a patent for a net for table tennis.

Their plant in Barnsley, South Yorkshire manufactured tennis balls and exported them round the world. The plant closed in 2002, and production is now based in the Philippines.

In 1902, Slazenger was appointed as the official tennis ball supplier to The Championships at Wimbledon, and it remains the longest unbroken sporting sponsorship in history.

In 1910, a public company was incorporated to acquire Slazenger and Sons, "manufacturers of sports equipment, india rubber, gutta percha and waterproof goods, leather merchants and dealers", which floated on the stock market. In 1931, Slazenger acquired H. Gradidge and Sons.

=== War years (1939–1945) ===
During the Second World War, Slazenger, like most manufacturers of non-essential items in the UK, redirected its production to manufacture a wide variety of components for military purposes, utilising their expertise in wood and rubber manufacturing.

On 15 September 1940, during the Blitz on London, incendiary bombs fell on the Slazenger factory and on the Gradidge factory in Woolwich. The competing William Sykes Ltd factory at Horbury was undamaged by the bombings. Slazenger and Gradidge were able to continue production at other facilities but began a series of mergers with competing companies. In 1942, it acquired William Sykes Ltd to broaden its wartime production facilities. Around 1940, Slazenger acquired F. H. Ayres. Founded in 1810 by Edward Ayres, the firm manufactured a range of sporting equipment but was best known as a high-quality manufacturer of archery equipment and in particular the bow (or longbow, as it is more commonly known).

The following lists a snapshot of some of the company's larger contracts completed for the UK Government between 1939 and 1945, as recorded by Slazenger, Gradidge, Sykes and Ayres in 1946:

Larger Completed War Contracts
Rifle Furniture – No.4, Mark 1	858,500 sets. Each set comprising: 1 Butt, 1 Forestock, 1 each Handguard (front and rear)
	95,222 butts
	150,000 forestocks
	200,000 hand guard, front
	200,000 hand guard, rear
Lanchester SMG Machine Gun Carbine Butts	80,000
Stoppers, Leak - Wooden	430,000
Bayonet, No. 5, Mark 1, Grips, left and right hand	466,500
Stoppers, Leak - Wooden	430,000
Detonator Caps	17,500,000
Standard Snow and Sand Goggles	3,000,000
Gloves, M.T (Motor Transport)	280,335 pairs
Gloves, Workman U.S Forces	122,450 pairs
Gloves, Boxing, 8oz, laced	22,239 pairs
Gloves, Boxing, 8oz, elastic	19,394 pairs
Machetes, 15 inch Blade Sheaths	250,400

In Australia, Slazenger produced naval utility launches at Newcastle, New South Wales, for the country's war effort.

=== At its peak ===
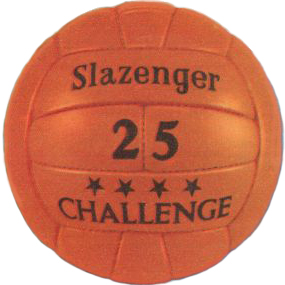
Official match ball of the 1966 FIFA World Cup

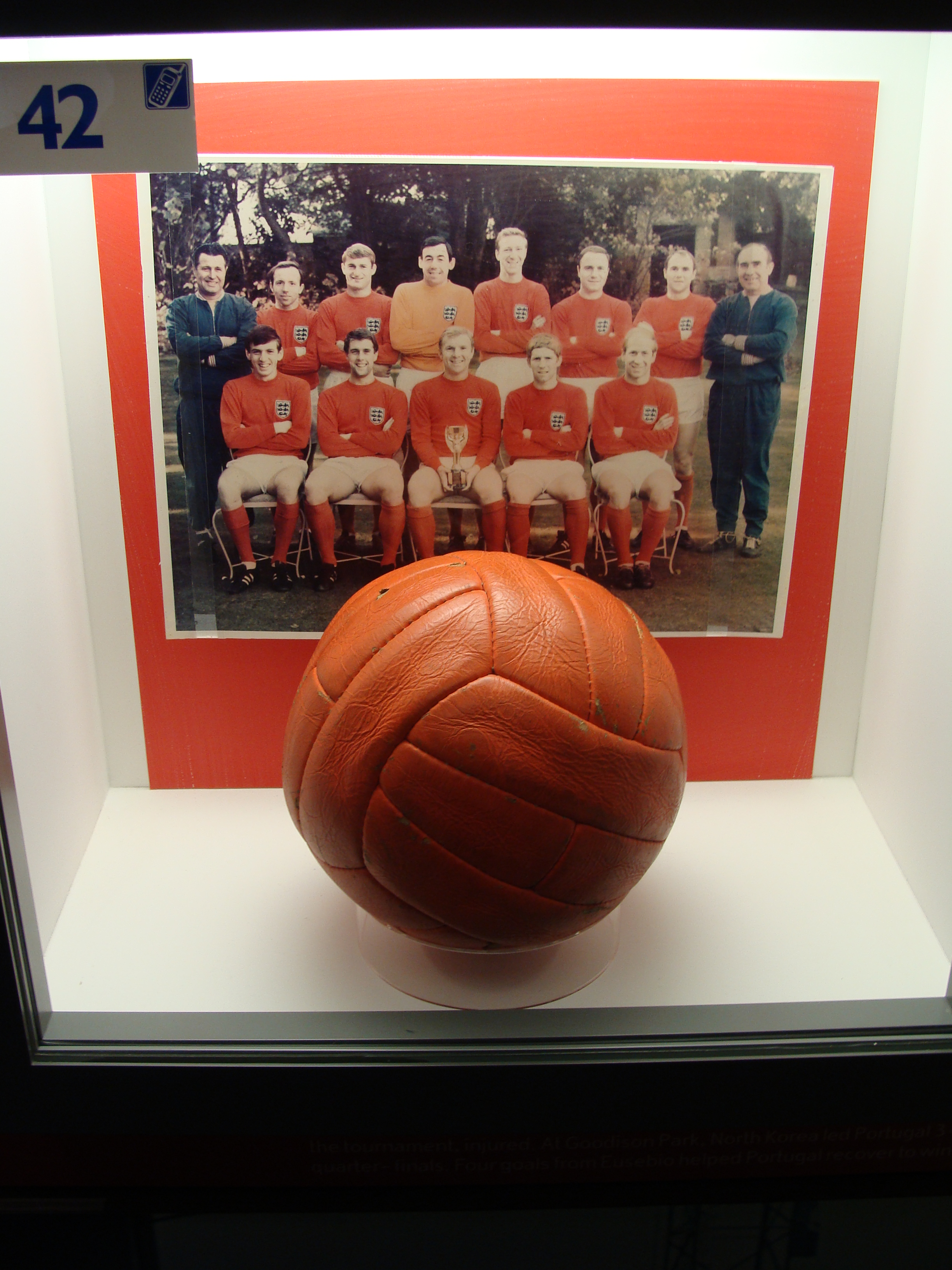
Match ball from the 1966 FIFA World Cup Final at the National Football Museum in Manchester, England

In its heyday, the Slazenger, Gradidge, Sykes and Ayres empire stretched across the world with either licensed distributors or agents and/or manufacturing operations with which the company had partnerships or licensing agreements. Distributors were found in New Zealand and Africa, as well as remote locations such as Iceland, Newfoundland, Madagascar and Bolivia.

=== Selling a brand ===
In the years when wooden tennis racquets predominated, brands such as Slazenger and Dunlop were major forces in the global market. However, with the rise in popularity of metal tennis racquets from the early 1980s and then the fast transition to even more popular composite materials such as fibreglass, graphite and Kevlar, more brands emerged and became popular due to their ability to meet consumer trends and demand for the new technology. Slazenger, in contrast, was slow to react. The company could not re-gear its existing factories to produce products using the new materials and there was a major existing investment in plant and raw materials. The company tried to market its product against these new products using quality as its unique selling point, but the quality level of imports quickly improved and Slazenger lost popularity and fell from prominence.

- 1959: Ralph Slazenger Jr. sold the family business to Dunlop Rubber.
- 1985: Dunlop Rubber was purchased by BTR plc, which formed a Sports Group combining Slazenger with the Dunlop Sport branded goods.
- 1996: BTR sold Dunlop Sport in a management buyout for £300 million – the buyout was backed by investment company Cinven. The new company was to be known as "Dunlop Slazenger".
- 2004: Cinven sold Dunlop Slazenger to Sports Direct International for a reported £40 million, who in turn sold on the rights to the Slazenger Golf brand in Europe to JJB Sports.

=== Global rights and licensing ===
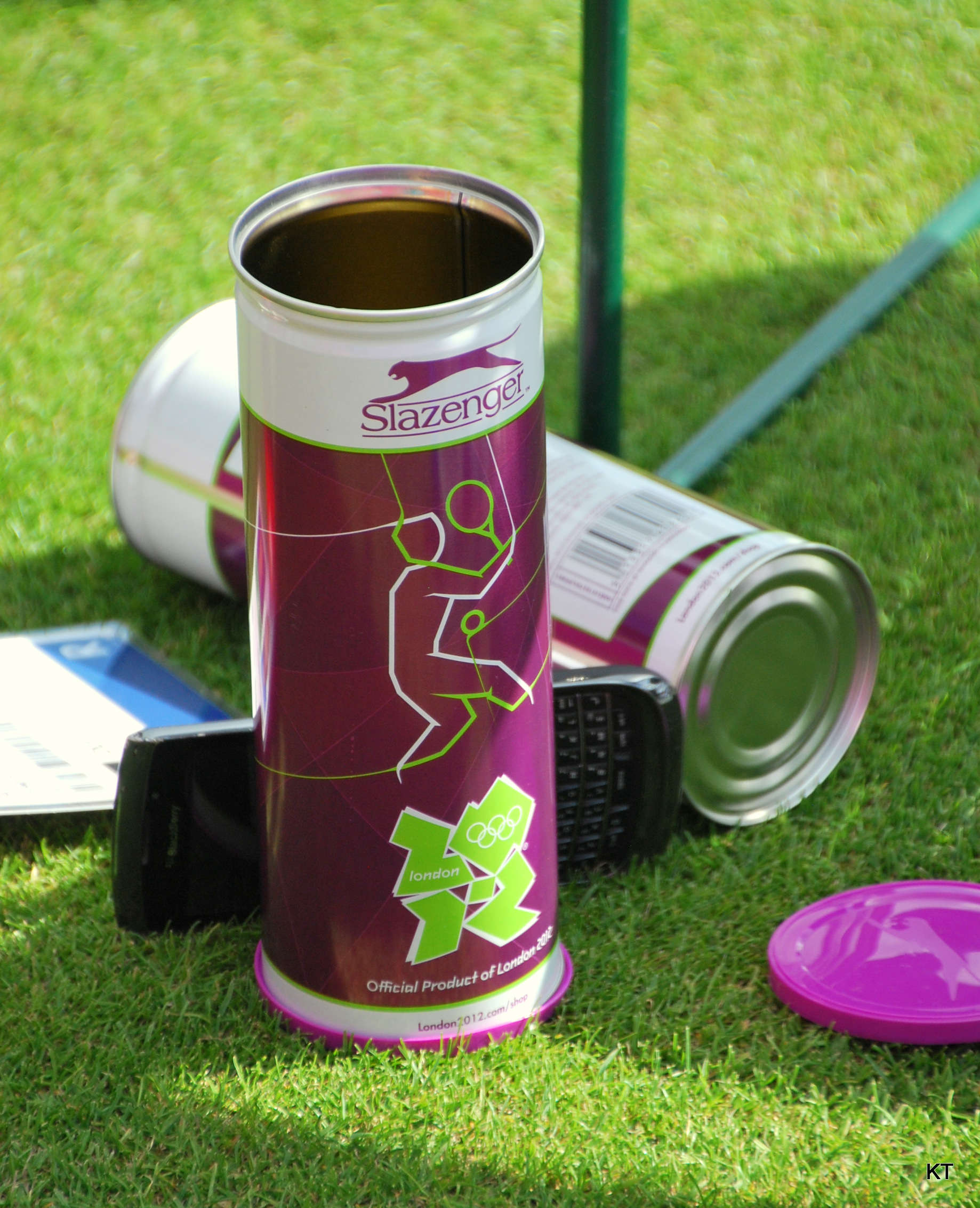
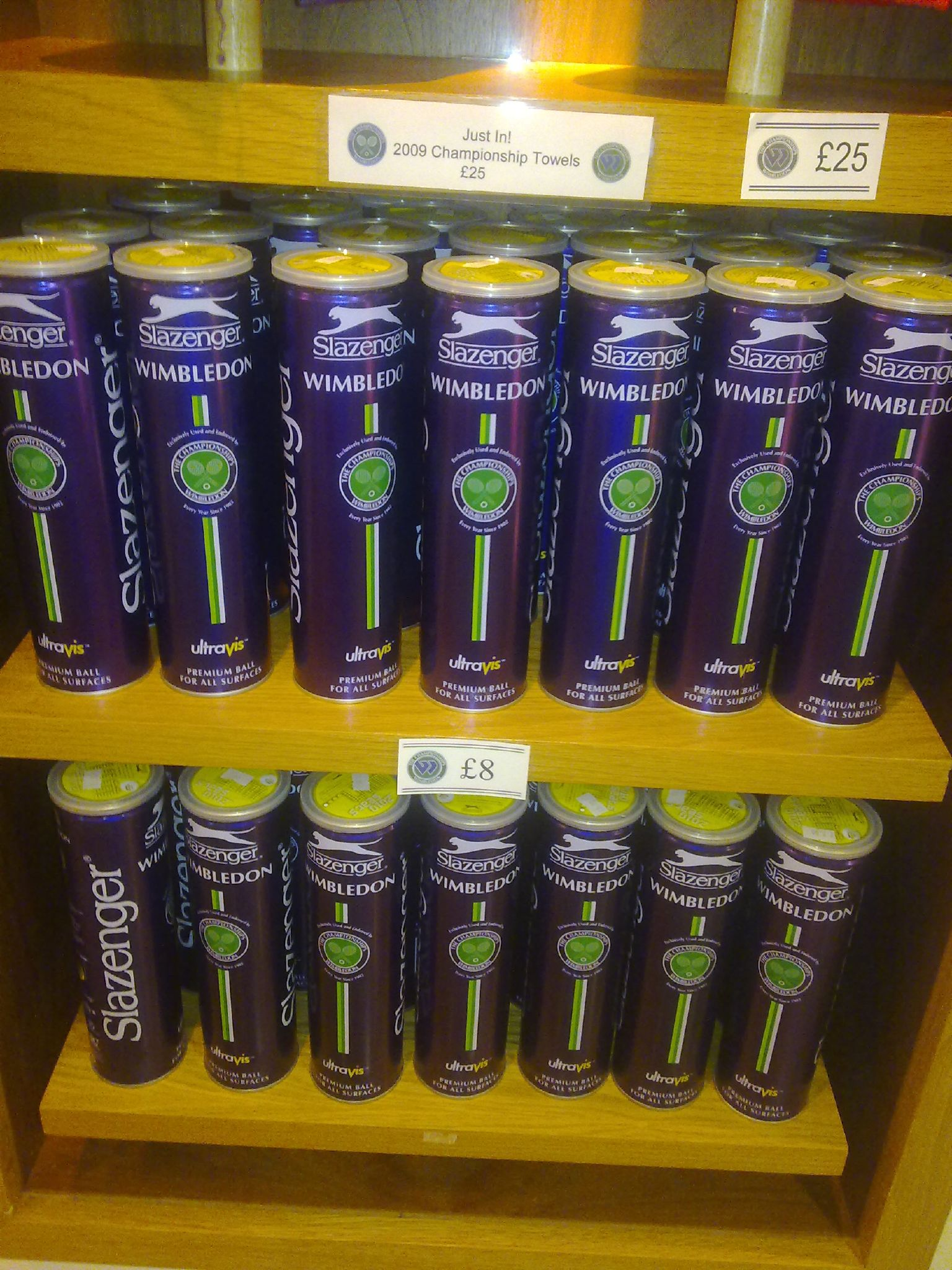
Left: Tube of Slazenger tennis balls at the 2012 London Olympics, and right: on sale at Wimbledon

The purchase of Dunlop Slazenger by Sports World International (SWI) did not confer global rights to the brand. SWI chose not to diversify the brands it acquired internally, and thus strain its own resources and finances, but to license them globally. With Slazenger, this was achieved successfully, with the Slazenger name being seen on a wide range of products not previously associated with the brand, such as sunglasses, toiletries and bicycles.

In Australia and New Zealand, the Slazenger brand is owned and licensed by Pacific Brands, with full and exclusive rights to sell and distribute throughout those territories. From the early 2000s due to poor management sales plummeted. Rather than investing in the brand, the Slazenger management began downsizing staff numbers, closing branches, cutting back long-standing sponsorship as well as stripping back costs elsewhere within the business. Despite these radical moves the Slazenger brand still ultimately offered no real return to Pacific Brands and in 2010/11 they sub-licensed it to Spartan Sports who had been operating in Australia since 2005 and is owned by Spartan Sports in Jallandhar, India (established in 1954).

== Products ==
Range of products under the brand Slazenger includes:

Sport / type	Products
Cricket	Bats, balls, team uniforms, helmets, cleat, gloves, pads
Field hockey	Sticks, balls, pads, gloves, goaltender masks
Golf	Clubs, balls
Swimming	Swimsuits
Tennis	Rackets, balls, shoes
Clothing (general)	T-shirts, polo shirts, jackets, hoodies, fleece jackets, sweaters, pants, shorts, leggings
Accessories (general)	Bags, watches, sunglasses

== Sponsorships ==
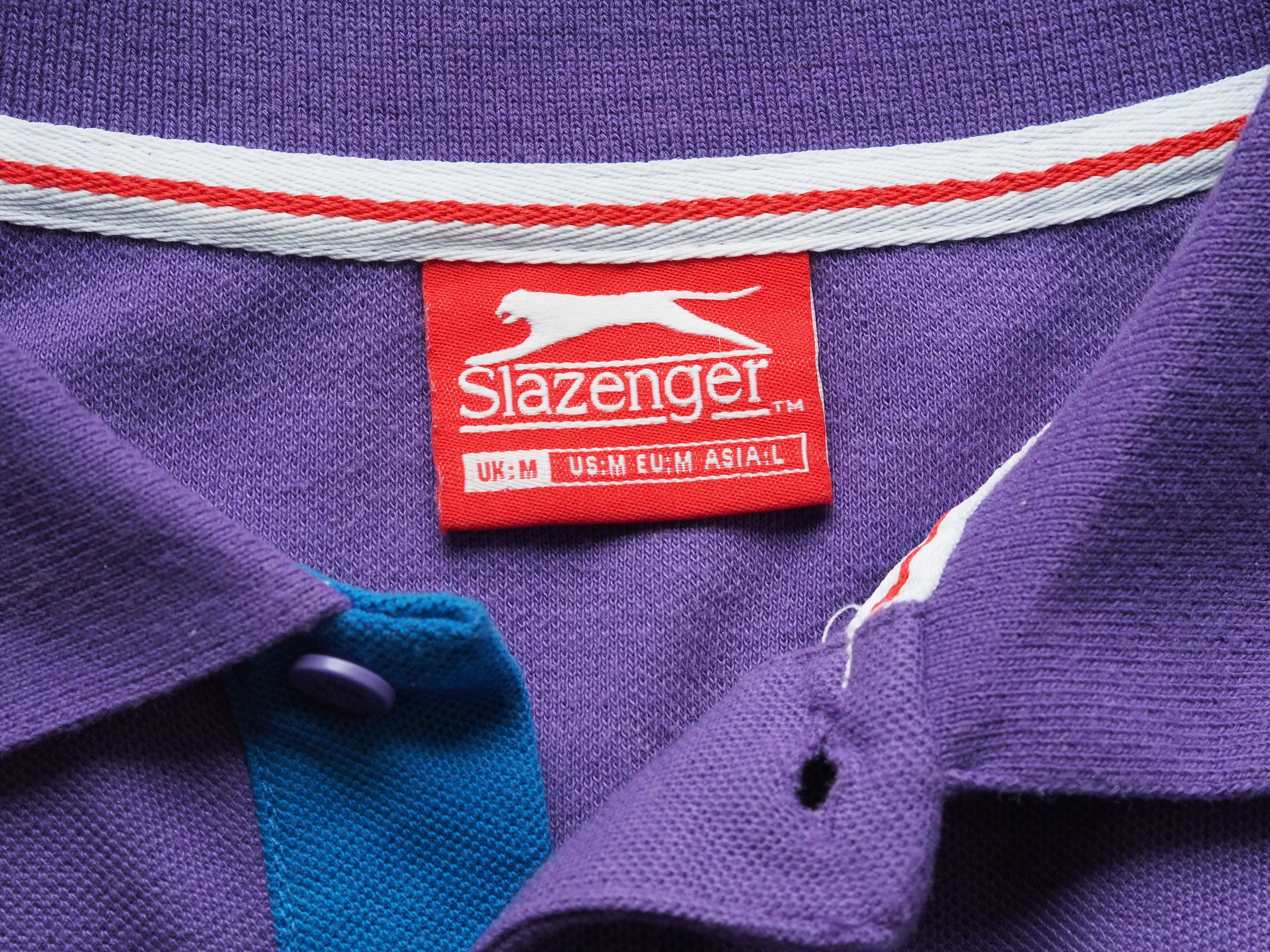
Slazenger label on a polo shirt

During its peak, many famous cricket players such as Sir Don Bradman, Sir Garfield Sobers, Sir Viv Richards, Sir Len Hutton, Denis Compton, Rohan Kanhai, Mark Waugh, Jacques Kallis, Jason Roy, James Anderson, and Geoffrey Boycott used Slazenger's bats and products. The Pakistan cricket team wore the Slazenger kit in their winning campaign during the 2009 ICC World Twenty20. In tennis, Fred Perry switched to Slazenger tennis rackets in 1932 before winning his first Wimbledon title in 1934.

There are also many famous golf players who have used Slazenger products, such as Jack Nicklaus, Seve Ballesteros, Tom Weiskopf, Tom Watson and Johnny Miller. The first Slazenger golf clubs were manufactured by Gow of the Glasgow Golf Club in 1890, followed by their first golf ball, the 'Guttie', in 1891; Harold Hilton won the 1892 and 1897 Open Championship using Slazenger golf balls. Besides professional golf players, film-star Sean Connery also wore the Slazenger v-neck jumper while playing golf in his free time. Furthermore, in the golf scene in the James Bond film Goldfinger (1964) which took place at Stoke Park Golf Club in Buckinghamshire, he wears a burgundy v-neck Slazenger jumper and the Slazenger brand of golf balls are shown on screen and mentioned several times in dialogue—Bond: "You play a Slazenger 1, don't you?"—as they play a key plot point.
