= Vélodrome de Bretagne =

Indoor velodrome in Loudéac, Brittany, France

Coordinates: 48°11′06″N 2°45′07″W

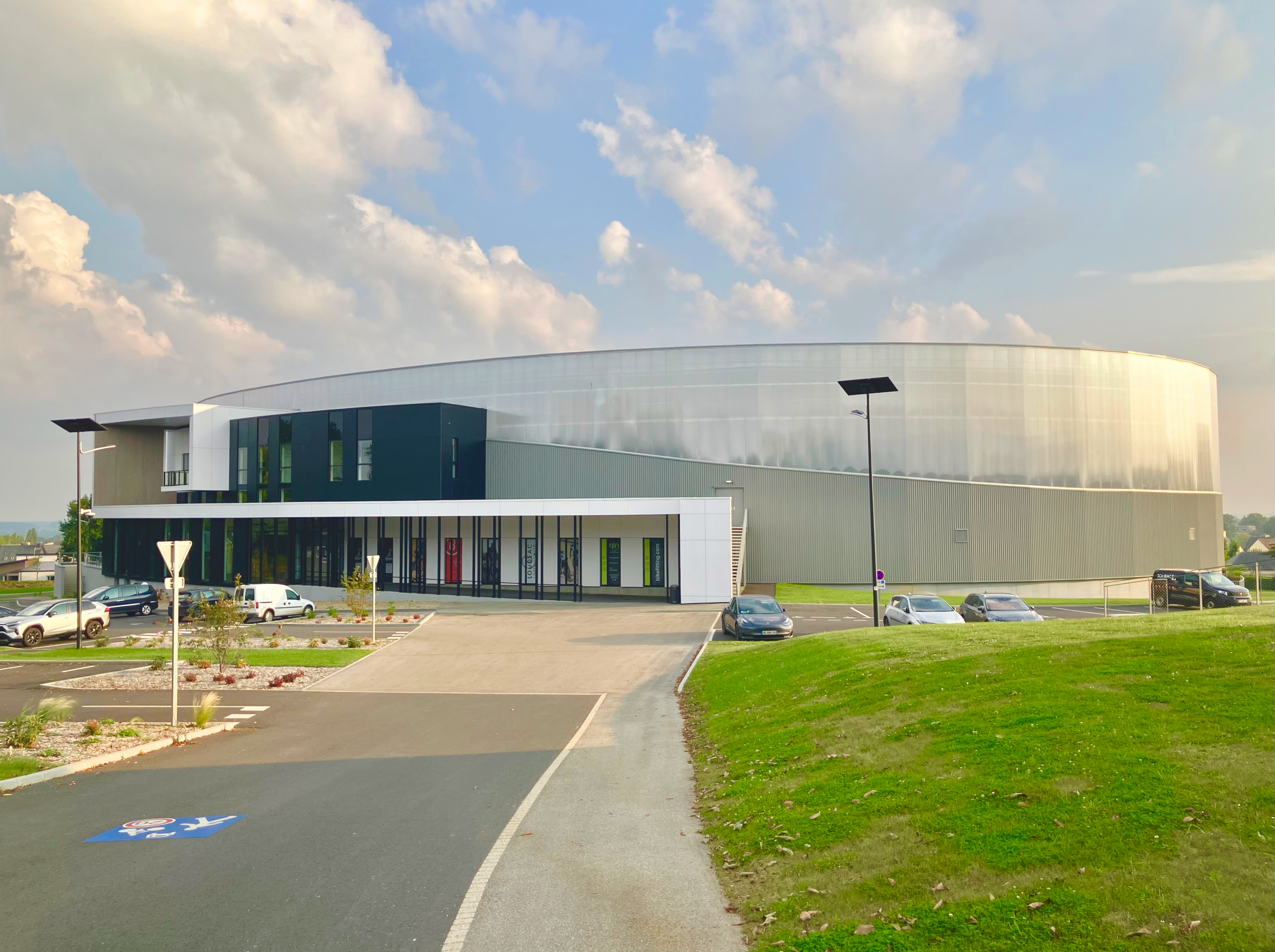
- The Vélodrome de Bretagne in Loudéac in Côtes d’Armor.
- Interactive map of Vélodrome de Bretagne
- Address: 18, rue des Livaudières, 22600; Loudéac, Brittany; France
- Capacity: 500
- Surface: Wood
- Field size: 200 meter

Construction
- Opened: September 2023
- Cost: €13.38m

Website
- https://velodromedebretagne.bzh

The Vélodrome de Bretagne is a 500 seat, 1500 person capacity Velodrome in the French town of Loudeac in Brittany. Work to build the Velodrome started in January 2022 and took 18 months to complete at a cost of €13.38m. It is the first covered Velodrome in Brittany.

== The Henri Caresmel Velodrome ==
Before the 'Velodrome de Bretagne' was built there was an outdoor velodrome in Loudéac called 'The Henri Caramel Velodrome'. It was built in 1946 and was originally named 'The Noëlles Velodrome'. It was a 303m, 6.5m wide track. The track was demolished in 2022. Over the years the track was raced by some of Brittany's best known cyclists including; Louison Bobet, Raymond Poulidor and Bernard Hinault.
