= Flannels (retail) =

British retail company

The Flannels Group Limited

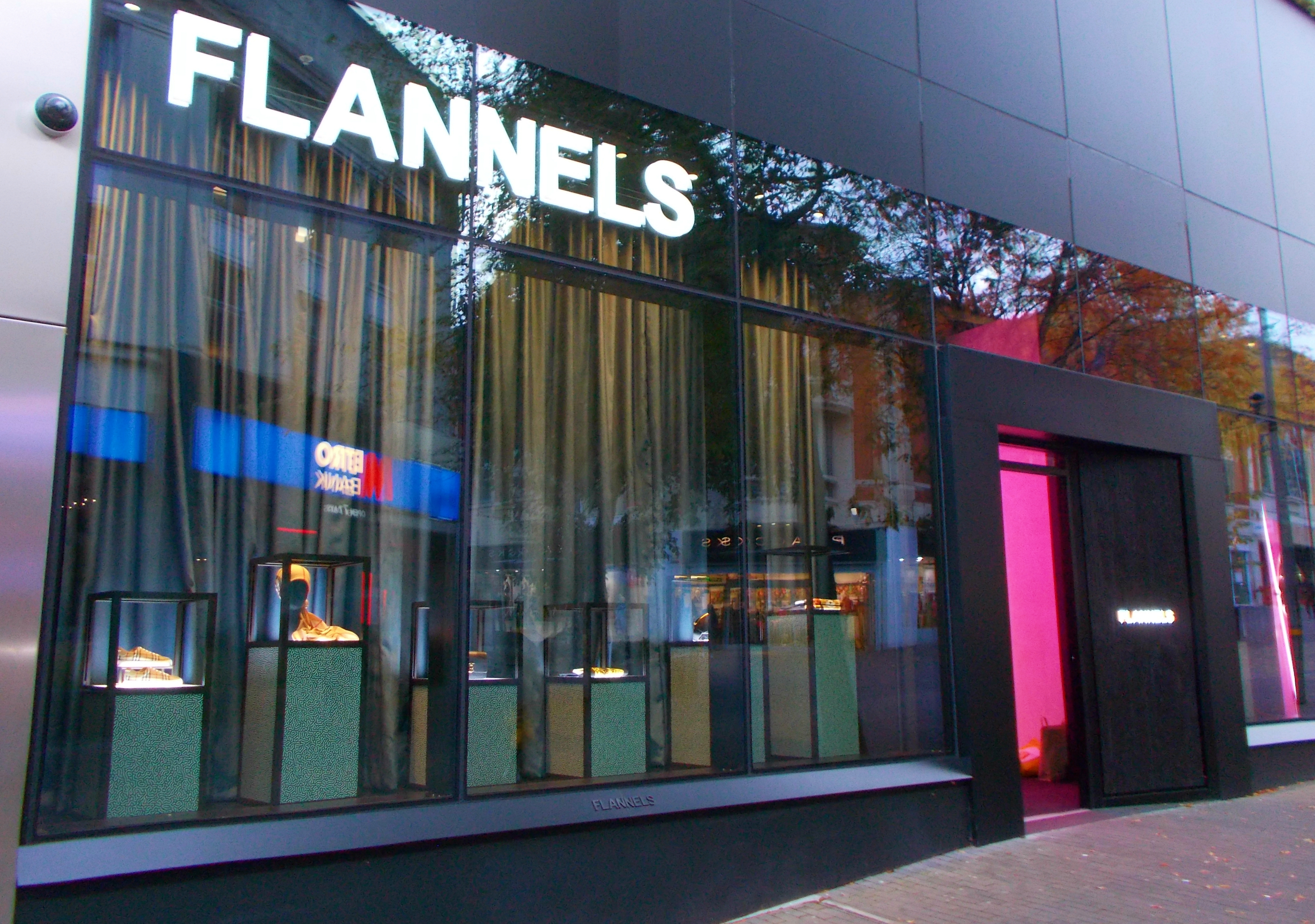
- Branch in Sutton, London
- Trade name: Flannels
- Formerly: Cleverjoin Limited (1988–2000)
- Type: Private
- Industry: Retail
- Founded: 1976; 50 years ago
- Founder: Neil Prosser
- Headquarters: London, United Kingdom
- Number of locations: 50+
- Products: Clothing; Footwear; Accessories
- Services: Flannels Elite+; Flannels Rental
- Number of employees: 700 (2024)
- Parent: Frasers Group (Note: Sportsdirect.com Retail Limited is a private limited company registered in the United Kingdom, trading as Sports Direct. It is wholly owned by Frasers Group plc.)
- Website: flannels.com

The Flannels Group Limited, trading as Flannels, is a British luxury retailer. The company currently has 50+ locations open in the United Kingdom. In 1976, Neil Prosser founded Flannels. He remained the managing director until the brand was acquired by Frasers Group (formerly Sports Direct International) in 2017.

== History ==
Neil Prosser founded Flannels in 1976 with a menswear store in Knutsford, Cheshire.

Prosser's friendship with retailer Jim Gibson led to a joint venture in 1995 with womenswear and menswear stores under the name, Cruise Flannels, being opened in Nottingham and subsequently in Birmingham and Newcastle in 1996.

In February 2000, Prosser and Gibson went their separate ways after their venture grew to 17 stores nationwide, and the Cruise Flannels shops in Birmingham and Nottingham were rebranded as Flannels sites.

In 2012, Frasers Group bought a majority 51% stake in Flannels and in 2017, they acquired the brand in full.
