= Braehead Shopping Centre =

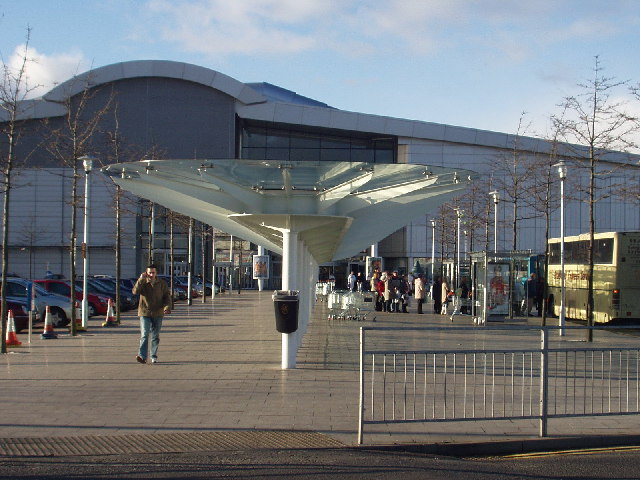
- Location: Renfrewshire, Scotland
- Coordinates: 55.875987°N 4.364843°W
- Opened: September 21, 1999
- Previous names: Intu Braehead (2013-2020)
- Owner: Frasers Group
- Num. of stores: 110
- Num. of anchor tenants: 7 (Primark, New Look, Boots, Next, Marks & Spencer, Sainsbury's and IKEA)
- Floor area: 98,474 m^{2} (1,059,970 sq ft)
- Floors: 2
- Parking: 7,900
- Public transit: Braehead (bus)
- Website: frasersplus.com/destinations/braehead

Braehead Shopping Centre (officially known as Frasers Plus Braehead), located in Renfrew, Scotland, opened in September 1999 and comprises 98,474 m^{2} (1,059,970 sq ft) of retail and leisure floorspace. The centre has 110 shops in the main covered mall, and a further 10 in a retail park of larger stores.

Since opening, the centre has proved popular with consumers, and it has even been blamed for a downturn in the fortunes of shops in nearby Paisley, Govan and Renfrew.

Sited within the same building as the shopping centre is the Braehead Arena and other facilities including an ice rink. In 2000, its curling facilities hosted the World Championships, and in 2005 they were used as training facilities when the Women's World Championships were being held in Paisley.

The area is known for its shopping centre of the same name, which was rebranded as Intu Braehead in 2013 and kept that name until 2020. The rebranding was done as part of a corporate rebranding exercise by Capital Shopping Centres plc, which itself was renamed as Intu Properties PLC.

== History ==
On 7 October 2011, a father was stopped by security and questioned by police under anti-terror legislation after photographing his daughter at an ice-cream stall. This resulted in a social media backlash and statements from both Braehead's management and Strathclyde Police.

As of January 2013, a planning application was submitted to Renfrewshire Council for 'permission in principle' to build a new mixed-use development at the centre.

In 2018, Braehead was named the top Scottish shopping centre in a GlobalData report.

Following Intu Properties plc entering administration in June 2020, a subsidiary of the company called Intu SGS received funding to take full control of the centre along with Lakeside, Victoria Centre and Intu Watford. The transfer from Intu to Intu SGS is expected to take place by the end of 2020, and will involve Global Mutual becoming asset manager of the centres and Savills serving as property manager.

In 2020, it was reported that Braehead Shopping Centre was trialling the use of full-body security scanners at the entrance.

In 2025, SGS UK Retail sold Braehead Shopping Centre to Frasers Group. The centre was officially rebranded under their Frasers Plus Brand.
