= Gelert (company) =

British outdoor equipment company

Gelert Limited
- Trade name: Gelert
- Industry: Camping and leisure
- Founded: 13 June 1975
- Headquarters: Martland Park, Wigan
- Products: Camping, walking, and mountaineering equipment
- Number of employees: 40
- Parent: Frasers Group
- Website: gelert.com

Gelert Limited is a British camping and outdoor clothing importer founded in Gwynedd, Wales. Since 2013, it has been owned by Frasers Group.

== History ==
The company is named after the dog Gelert of Prince Llywelyn the Great, who was Prince of Gwynedd. It started in Bryncir in Gwynedd in 1970. In 2003 it announced plans for a £4.5 million expansion to its Porthmadog base, which opened in 2004. It has the exclusive licence to the QuickPitch tent designed by Bournemouth University graduate Franziska Conrad.

In 2012 the company closed its Porthmadog headquarters, which it relocated to its Widnes site. In June 2013 the company went into administration and was taken over by Sports Direct International PLC.

== Products ==
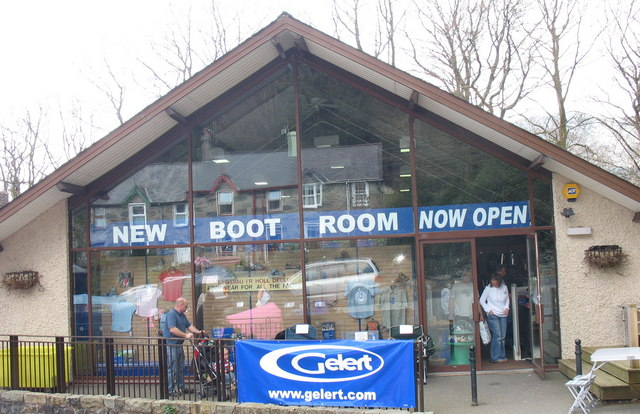
Camping shop selling Gelert equipment

The products it sells are:

- Tents
- Sleeping bags
- Rucksacks
- Walking equipment
- Outdoor cooking equipment
- Torches and camping lights
- Outdoor clothing and walking boots
- Equestrian clothing
- Fishing clothing
- Workwear
- Pet equipment and some pet food
