= Sweatshop (retailer) =

- Formerly: Chris Brasher's Sporting Emporium
- Founded: 1971; 55 years ago
- Fate: Acquired by Sports Direct
- Area served: United Kingdom
- Website: www.sweatshop.com

Sweatshop is a chain of running equipment shops in the United Kingdom with 12 branches (as of March 2018) and an online shop. It was founded by runner Chris Brasher in 1971, with the first shop in Teddington. Its original name was Chris Brasher's Sporting Emporium, and changed to Sweatshop in 1978.

Sweatshop was voted "best retailer" by readers and website visitors of the British edition of Runner's World magazine each year from 2008 to 2013.

Since 2003, Sweatshop has organised the Reading Half Marathon, held on the streets of Reading in March or early April of every year.

In 2014 Sports Direct became a major share holder.
