= The Legend of Zelda: Ocarina of Time =

1998 video game

The Legend of Zelda: Ocarina of Time (Note: Japanese: ゼルダの伝説 時のオカリナ, Hepburn: Zeruda no Densetsu: Toki no Okarina) is a 1998 action-adventure game developed and published by Nintendo for the Nintendo 64. It was the first Legend of Zelda game with 3D graphics. It was released in Japan and North America in November 1998 and in PAL regions the following month.

Ocarina of Time was developed by Nintendo's Entertainment Analysis & Development division. It was led by five directors, including Eiji Aonuma and Yoshiaki Koizumi, produced by series co-creator Shigeru Miyamoto, and written by Kensuke Tanabe. Series composer Koji Kondo wrote its soundtrack. The player controls Link in the kingdom of Hyrule on a quest to stop the evil Gerudo king Ganondorf by traveling through time and navigating dungeons and an overworld. The game introduced features such as a target-lock system and context-sensitive buttons, which have since become common in 3D adventure games. The player must play songs on an ocarina to progress.

Ocarina of Time set a record for video game pre-orders in the US and sold more than seven million copies worldwide. It was acclaimed by critics, who praised its visuals, sound, gameplay, soundtrack, and writing. It has been ranked by numerous publications as one of the greatest and most influential video games of all time. It is tied for highest-ranked game on Metacritic with 2026's Grand Theft Auto VI, and was the highest-rated game on the review aggregator GameRankings before the site's dissolution in 2019.

Ocarina of Time has been rereleased on every Nintendo home console and on the iQue Player in China. Some releases include Master Quest, an alternative version including new puzzles and increased difficulty. A sequel, Majora's Mask, was released for the Nintendo 64 in 2000. A remake for the Nintendo 3DS, Ocarina of Time 3D, was released in 2011. A second remake for the Nintendo Switch 2 was released on November 5, 2026.

== Gameplay ==
Gameplay examples

The player navigates the vast Hyrule Field, the central hub of the world. The on-screen display shows actions mapped to context-sensitive buttons.

When the player uses Z-targeting, the view shifts to a letterbox format and arrows indicate the targeted enemy. The player can then circle strafe around the enemy to keep their sight on them. In this particular screenshot, adult Link is fighting a Wolfos enemy at the entrance to the Forest Temple.

The Legend of Zelda: Ocarina of Time is a fantasy action-adventure game set in a 3D world with an expansive environment. The game world is mostly rendered in real-time polygonal 3D, while a few areas make use of pre-rendered backgrounds. The player controls Link from a third-person perspective. Link primarily fights with a sword and shield but can also use other weapons such as projectiles, bombs, and magic spells.

The control scheme introduced techniques such as context-sensitive actions and a targeting system called "Z-targeting", (Note: So named because it was executed by the Z button; Z-targeting is referred to as L-targeting in the GameCube and Nintendo 3DS rereleases.) which allows the player to have Link focus on enemies or objects. (Note: In the GameCube port of Ocarina of Time and the Wii's Virtual Console version, targeting is done with the L button instead of the Z button due to the position of the Z button on the GameCube controller and Classic Controller.) When using this technique, the camera follows the target and Link constantly faces it. Projectile attacks are automatically directed at the target and do not require manual aiming. Context-sensitive actions allow multiple tasks to be assigned to one button, simplifying the control scheme. The on-screen display shows what will happen when the button is pushed and changes depending on what the character is doing. For example, the button that causes Link to push a box if he is standing next to it will have him climb on the box if the analog stick is pushed toward it. Much of the game is spent exploring and fighting, but some parts require stealth.

Link gains abilities by collecting items and weapons found in dungeons or in the overworld, including several optional side quests and minor objectives. Side quests can reward new weapons or abilities. In one side quest, Link trades items with non-player characters in a trading sequence that features 10 items and ends with him receiving the two-handed Biggoron Sword, the strongest sword. In another side quest, Link can acquire a horse who allows him to travel faster but restricts him to only attacking with arrows while riding.

Link is given an ocarina near the beginning of the game, which is later replaced by the Ocarina of Time. Link learns 12 melodies that allow him to solve music-based puzzles and teleport to previously visited locations. The Ocarina of Time is also used to claim the Master Sword in the Temple of Time, which causes Link to be transported seven years into the future and become an adult. Young Link and adult Link have different abilities. For example, only adult Link can use the Fairy Bow, while only young Link can fit through certain small passages. After completing certain tasks, Link can travel freely between the two time periods by replacing and taking the sword.

== Plot ==
=== Setting ===
Ocarina of Time is set in the fictional kingdom of Hyrule, the setting of most Legend of Zelda games. Hyrule Field serves as the central hub, and is connected to several outlying areas with diverse topography which are home to the races of Hyrule. On the eastern outskirts of Hyrule are the Kokiri forest, where the childlike Kokiri and their fairy companions reside, and Zora River, home of the fish-like Zora race. North is Hyrule Castle and its surrounding town, where the royal family and most Hylians reside, and Kakariko Village at the foot of Death Mountain, home of the rock-consuming Gorons. The secluded western desert belongs to the Gerudo, a population mostly consisting of women who serve their king, a man that is born once every century. Lon Lon Ranch, a ranch renowned for its horses and high-quality milk, sits in the center of Hyrule Field, and Lake Hylia to the south serves as a touristic fishing attraction where the Water Temple resides.

=== Characters ===
Players control Link, a young boy living in the Kokiri Forest, which is also home to his Kokiri childhood friend Saria and guarded by the Great Deku Tree. Unlike other Kokiri, Link does not have a fairy companion until the Great Deku Tree instructs the fairy Navi to be his guide. Navi is used to contextualize Z-targeting for the player, and also provides hints and advice. On his quest, Link befriends Malon, daughter of Lon Lon Ranch's owner, Talon; Darunia, the leader of the Gorons; and Ruto, the Zora princess. Link also meets Princess Zelda, who is under the watch of her Sheikah caretaker, Impa, and encounters the King of the Gerudo, Ganondorf. Later in the game, Link meets Rauru, the Sage of Light who disguises himself as the owl Kaepora Gaebora, and Nabooru, the de facto leader of the Gerudo in Ganondorf's absence. Along the way, Link is aided by Sheik, a mysterious young Sheikah. Link is also aided by great fairies who give him magical abilities.

=== Story ===
Navi awakens Link from a nightmare in which he watches a man in black armor pursuing a young girl on horseback. Link is brought to the Great Deku Tree, who has been cursed by a "wicked man of the desert". Before dying, the Great Deku Tree gives Link the Spiritual Stone of the Forest and sends him to Hyrule Castle to speak with Hyrule's princess. At the Hyrule Castle garden, Link meets Princess Zelda, who believes Ganondorf—the man in black who cursed the Deku Tree—is seeking the Triforce, a holy relic that gives its holder godlike power. Zelda asks Link to obtain the three Spiritual Stones to enter the Sacred Realm and claim the Triforce before Ganondorf reaches it. After collecting the other two stones from Darunia and Ruto, Link returns to Hyrule Castle, where he sees Ganondorf pursue Zelda and Impa on horseback, like in his nightmare, and unsuccessfully attempts to stop him. Inside the Temple of Time, he uses the Spiritual Stones and the Ocarina of Time, a gift from Zelda, to open a chamber containing the Master Sword. As Link pulls it from its pedestal, he is incapacitated while Ganondorf enters the Sacred Realm, taunting Link for obtaining the Spiritual Stones for him.

Seven years later, an adult Link awakens in the Sacred Realm and is met by Rauru, one of the seven Sages who protect the entrance to the Sacred Realm. Rauru explains that the Master Sword was the key to the Sacred Realm, and pulling it allowed Ganondorf to claim the Triforce. Link's spirit was then sealed for seven years until he was old enough to wield the Master Sword and defeat Ganondorf, who has since taken over Hyrule. The seven Sages have the ability to imprison Ganondorf in the Sacred Realm, but five are unaware of their identities as Sages. Link is returned to the Temple of Time and meets the mysterious Sheik, who guides him to free five temples from Ganondorf's control and allow their Sages to awaken. Link is able to freely travel between his childhood and the present by placing the Master Sword back in its pedestal, which he uses to awaken the five Sages: Saria, Darunia, Ruto, Impa, and Nabooru. Afterwards, Sheik reveals himself to be a disguised adult Zelda and the seventh Sage. Zelda explains that Ganondorf's heart was unbalanced, causing the Triforce to split into three pieces; Ganondorf acquired only the Triforce of Power, while Zelda received the Triforce of Wisdom and Link the Triforce of Courage.

Ganondorf captures Zelda and teleports her to his castle, intending to use her and Link's pieces of the Triforce to increase his power. The other six Sages help Link enter the stronghold, where he frees Zelda after defeating Ganondorf, who destroys the castle in an attempt to kill them. After they escape, Ganondorf emerges from the rubble and uses the Triforce of Power to transform into a boar-like beast named Ganon, whom Link defeats with Zelda's aid. The seven Sages seal Ganondorf—who vows to exterminate their descendants using the Triforce of Power someday when the seal is broken—in the Sacred Realm, now the Evil Realm. Zelda uses the Ocarina of Time to send Link back to his childhood. Navi departs, and child Link meets child Zelda in the castle garden once more, where he passes on knowledge of Hyrule's fate to prevent its decline.

== Development ==
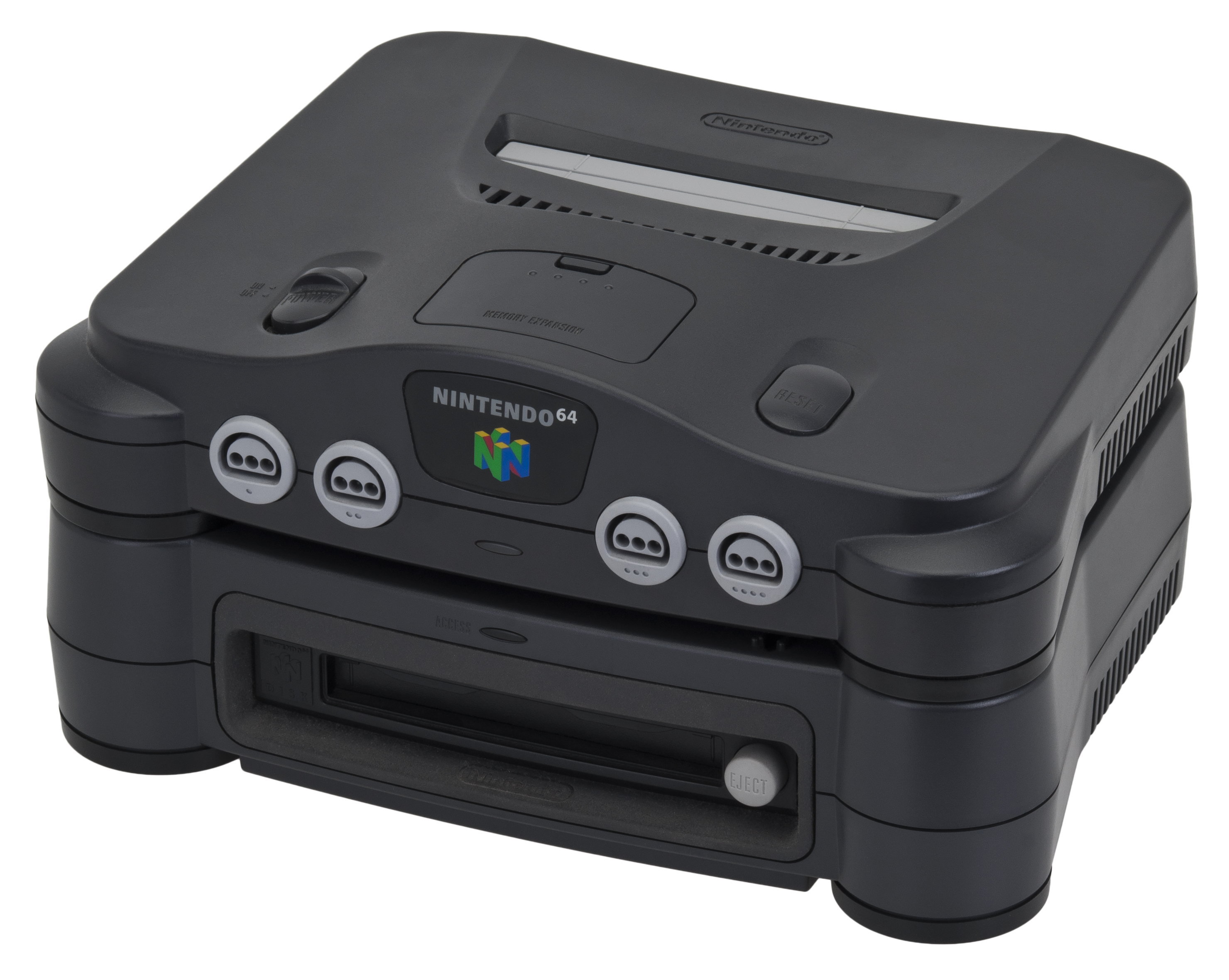
The Nintendo 64 with 64DD attached

Ocarina of Time was developed concurrently with Super Mario 64 and Mario Kart 64 for the Nintendo 64 by Nintendo's Entertainment Analysis & Development (EAD) division in 1994, for more than $12 million with a staff of more than 200.

Development was migrated from the 64DD disk drive peripheral to cartridge due to the high data throughput of streaming 500 motion-captured character animations throughout gameplay. Initially targeting 16 megabytes, it was increased to 32 megabytes, as Nintendo's largest game at the time. Early in development, the team had concerns about the data storage constraints of the cartridge; in the worst-case scenario, Ocarina of Time would follow a similar structure to Super Mario 64, with Link restricted to Ganondorf's castle as a central hub, using a portal system similar to the paintings that Mario uses to traverse the realm. An idea that arose from this stage of development, a battle with a doppelganger of Ganondorf that rides through paintings, was used as the boss of the Forest Temple dungeon.

While series co-creator Shigeru Miyamoto had been the principal director and producer of Super Mario 64, he was involved in the game's production and now in charge of five directors by acting as a producer and supervisor of Ocarina of Time. Different parts were handled by different directors, a new strategy for Nintendo EAD. Four or five initial teams grew over time, each working on different basic experiments, including scenario and planning, Link's actions, transforming classic 2D items into improved 3D form, camera experiments, motion capture, sound, special effects, and the flow of time. The dungeons were designed by Eiji Aonuma.

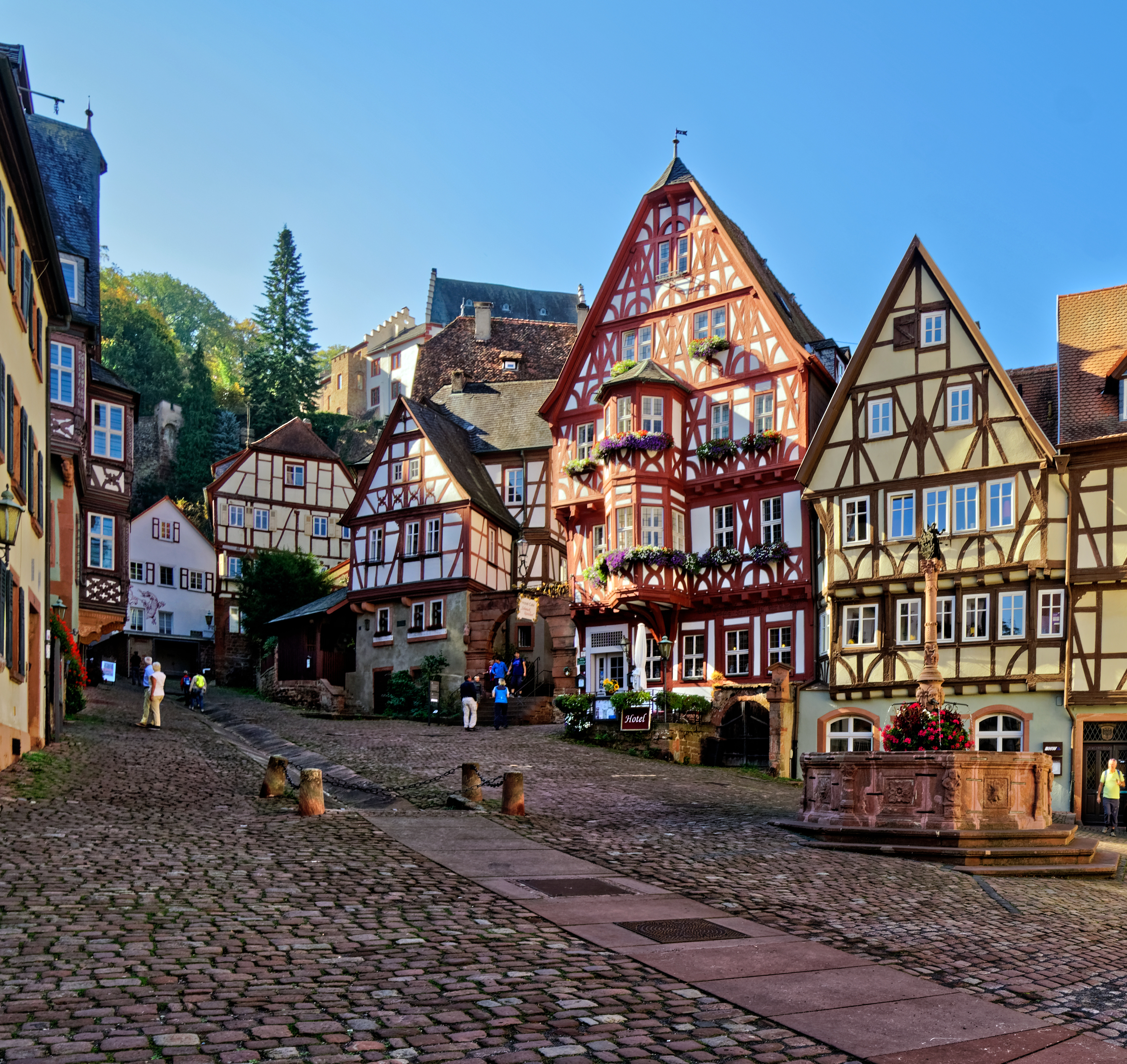
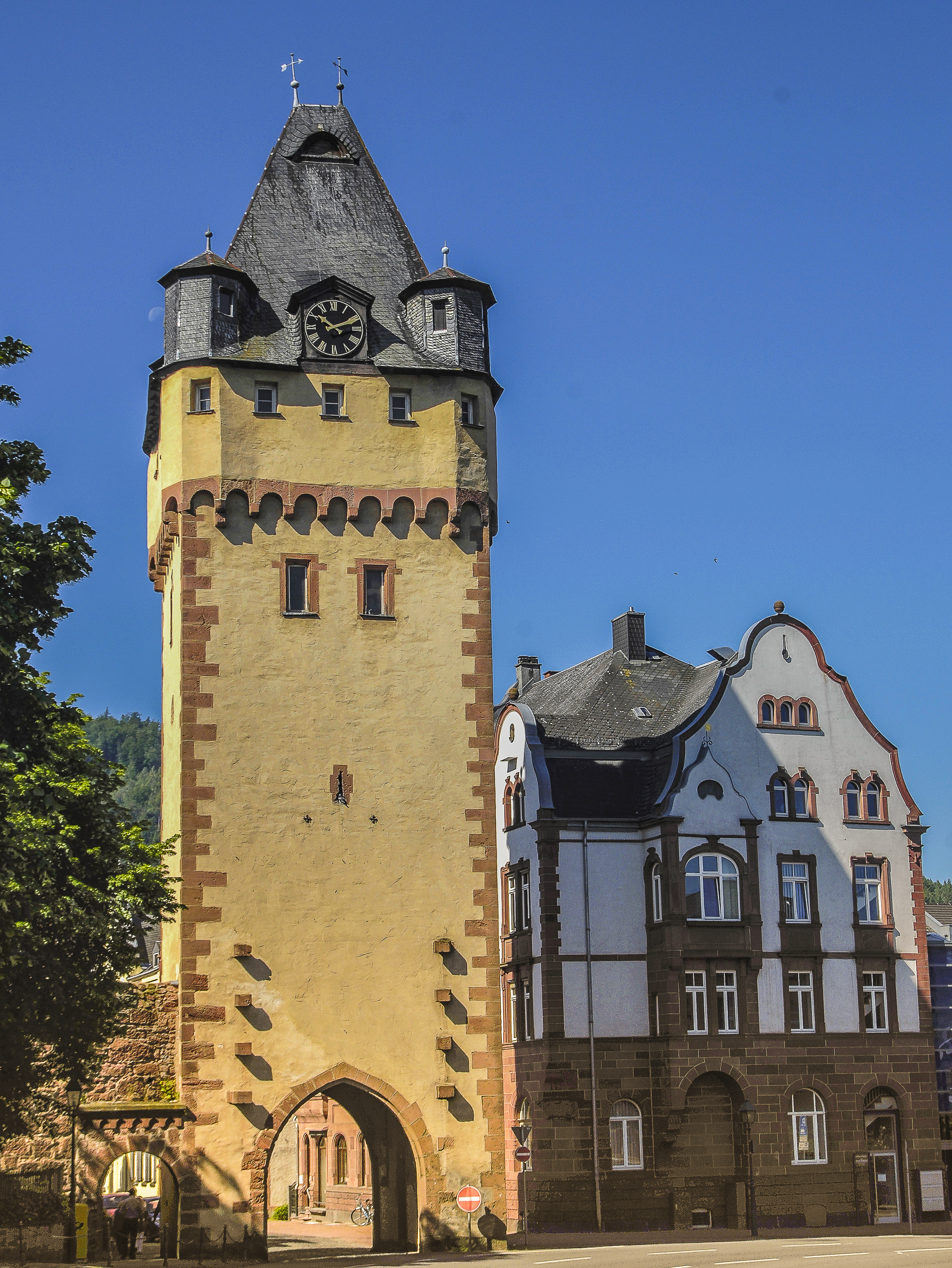
Miyamoto drew inspiration for the market around Hyrule Castle from half-timbering in Lower Franconia.

Although the development team was new to 3D games, assistant director Makoto Miyanaga recalled a "passion for creating something new and unprecedented". The towns in Ocarina of Time were based on medieval Europe. When creating Hyrule Castle's market, Miyamoto traveled to Germany for inspiration of its half-timbered architecture in Lower Franconia, spending a few weeks in northern Bavaria. Despite the setting being a "medieval tale of sword and sorcery", Miyamoto used the chanbara (samurai) genre of Japanese sword fighting as a model for the combat and was content with the positive worldwide reception. The development involved more than 120 people, including stunt performers used to capture the effects of sword fighting and Link's movement. Miyamoto initially intended Ocarina of Time to be played in a first-person perspective to enable players to take in the vast terrain of Hyrule Field better and let the team focus more on developing enemies and environments. The concept was abandoned once the idea of a child Link was introduced, and Miyamoto believed it necessary for Link to be visible on screen. Originally Z-targeting involved a generic marker, but Koizumi changed the design to that of a fairy to make it less "robotic". The fairy gained the name of the "Fairy Navigation System" amongst staff, and ultimately, this turned into the nickname "Navi", which in turn resulted in the "birth" of Navi's character. The "birth" of Navi was a pivotal point in the story's development. Kazuaki Morita created the fishing pond originally as a secret programming project, having previously added it to Link's Awakening as fishing was his favorite hobby.

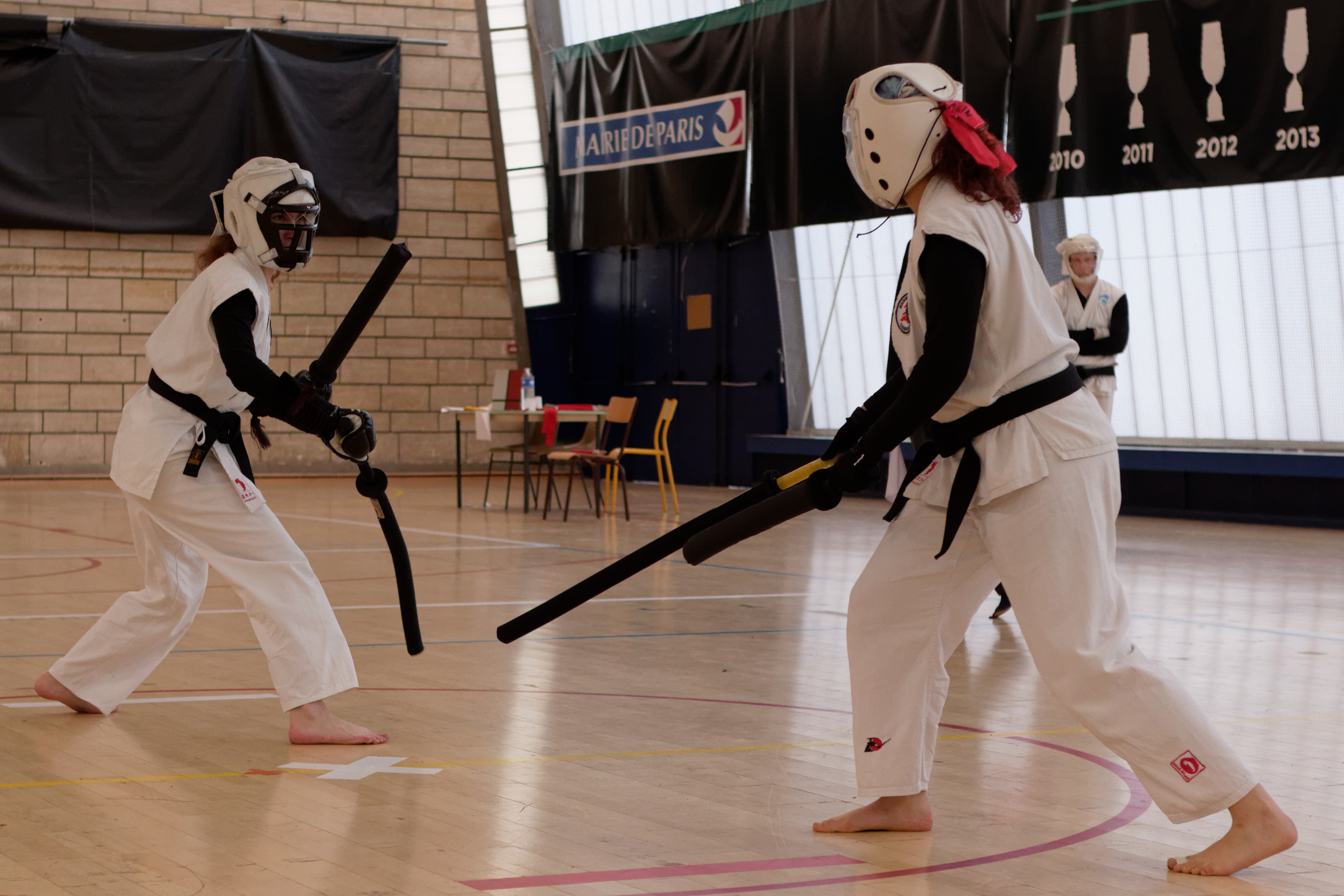
The developers were inspired by chanbara (samurai) sword techniques, as seen in this photo.

Miyamoto wanted to make a game that was cinematic yet distinguished from films. Takumi Kawagoe, a cutscene director for Nintendo, said that his priority was to have the player feel in control of the action. To promote this instantaneous continuity of cinematic gameplay, the cutscenes in Ocarina of Time are completely generated with real-time computing on the Nintendo 64 and do not use prerendered full-motion video. Miyamoto's vision required this real-time architecture for the total of more than 90 minutes of cutscenes, regardless of whether the console had a vast medium like CD-ROM on which to store prerendered versions. Toru Osawa created the story based on an idea by Miyamoto and Yoshiaki Koizumi. He was supported by A Link to the Past and Link's Awakening script writer Kensuke Tanabe. Miyamoto said the real-time rendering engine allowed his small team of 3 to 7 cinematic developers to rapidly adjust the storyline and to focus on developing additional gameplay elements even up to the final few months of development, instead of waiting on a repeated prerendering process. Character designer Satoru Takizawa described Ocarina of Time as having a more "realistic" visual style for the series.

Some of Miyamoto's ideas were instead used in Super Mario 64, since it was to be released first. Other ideas were not used due to time constraints. A storytelling shopkeep character named "Hobbit" that was initially to be cut was eventually repurposed as the Deku Scrubs later in development. Ocarina of Time originally ran on the same engine as Super Mario 64 but was so heavily modified that Miyamoto considers the final products different engines. One major difference between the two is camera control; compared to that of Super Mario 64, the camera in Ocarina of Time is much more limited and is largely controlled by the AI. Miyamoto said the camera controls for Ocarina of Time are intended to reflect a focus on the game's world, whereas those of Super Mario 64 are centered on the character of Mario. Miyamoto wanted the difficulty level to be accessible to all players, and in particular he wanted it to be easier than Super Mario 64.

=== Music ===
Ocarina of Time's music was written by Koji Kondo, the composer in charge of music for most Zelda games. In addition to characters having musical themes, areas of Hyrule are also associated with pieces of music. This has been called leitmotif in reverse—instead of music announcing an entering character, it now introduces a stationary environment as the player approaches. In some locations, the music is a variation of an ocarina tune the player learns, related to that area.

Beyond providing a backdrop for the setting, music plays an integral role in gameplay. The button layout of the Nintendo 64 controller resembles the holes of the ocarinas in the game, and players must learn to play several songs. All songs are played using the five notes available on an ocarina, although by bending pitches via the analog stick, players can play additional tones. Kondo said that creating distinct themes on the limited scale was a "major challenge" but feels that the result is very natural. The popularity of Ocarina of Time led to an increase in ocarina sales.

The official soundtrack of Ocarina of Time was published by Pony Canyon and released in Japan on December 18, 1998. It comprises one compact disc with 82 tracks. An American version was also released, although with fewer tracks and different packaging artwork. Many critics praised the music in Ocarina of Time, although IGN was disappointed that the traditional Zelda overworld theme was not included. In 2001, three years after the initial release of Ocarina of Time, GameSpot labeled it as one of the top ten video game soundtracks. The soundtrack, at the time, was not released in Europe or Australia. In 2011, however, a 51-track limited edition soundtrack for the 3DS version was available in a free mail out through a Club Nintendo offer to owners of the 3DS edition, as an incentive to register the product. The original musical theme for the Fire Temple area contained a sample of the adhan and was altered in later revisions of the game, due to Nintendo's policy of not including real religious references in their products; the altered theme simply removed the sample.

In 1999, a live performance album of twelve orchestrated versions of songs from the game, entitled The Legend of Zelda: Ocarina of Time Hyrule Symphony, was released in Japan by SM Records Ltd. Hero of Time, an orchestral recording of Ocarina of Time's score performed by the Slovak National Symphony Orchestra, was released by video game label Materia Collective in 2017. A vinyl version was published by iam8bit. It was nominated for "Best Game Music Cover/Remix" at the 16th Annual Game Audio Network Guild Awards.

== Release ==
Ocarina of Time was first shown as a technical and thematic demonstration video at Nintendo's Shoshinkai trade show in December 1995. Nintendo planned to release Super Mario 64 as a launch game for the Nintendo 64 and later release Ocarina of Time for the 64DD, a disk drive peripheral for the system that was still in development. Problems with performance of the 64DD peripheral led to development being moved from disk to cartridge media, and thus the game would miss its scheduled 1997 holiday season release and was delayed into 1998. They planned to follow its release with a 64DD expansion disk. Miyamoto additionally attributed the delay to Nintendo prioritizing development efforts to Yoshi's Story after that game missed its planned second quarter release slot, as well as the desire to better compete with Banjo-Kazooie.

Throughout the late 1990s, the Nintendo 64 was said to lack hit first-party games. Next Generation wrote that "Nintendo absolutely can't afford another holiday season without a real marquee title"; they further wrote that Zelda was "one of the most anticipated games of the decade", upon which the Nintendo 64's fate depended. Nintendo spent $10 million on Ocarina of Time's marketing. In March 1998, it was the most anticipated Nintendo 64 game in Japan. Chairman Howard Lincoln insisted at E3 1998 that Zelda ship on time and become Nintendo's reinvigorating blockbuster, akin to a hit Hollywood movie.

Customers in North America who pre-ordered the Ocarina of Time received a limited-edition box with a golden plastic card reading "Collector's Edition". This edition contained a gold-colored cartridge, a tradition that began with the original Legend of Zelda (1986) for the Nintendo Entertainment System. Demand was so great that Electronics Boutique stopped presales on November 3, 1998.

Several versions of Ocarina of Time were produced, with later revisions featuring minor changes such as glitch repairs, the recoloring of Ganondorf's blood from crimson to green, and the alteration of the music heard in the Fire Temple dungeon to remove a sample of an Islamic prayer chant. The sample was taken from a commercially available sound library, but the developers did not realize it contained Islamic references. Although popularly believed to have been changed due to public outcry, the chanting was removed after Nintendo discovered it violated policy of avoiding religious material, and the altered versions of Ocarina of Time were made prior to the original release.

=== Rereleases ===
Nintendo re-released Ocarina of Time on its next console, the GameCube, via a bonus disc given to those who pre-ordered The Legend of Zelda: The Wind Waker (2002) in Japan and North America, or included with a limited edition bundle in Europe. The disc included the original game and a second, more difficult Master Quest version, marking its first official release. Ocarina of Time was also included in The Legend of Zelda: Collector's Edition (2003), a Zelda game compilation for the GameCube. The collection was included in GameCube bundles worldwide and given to those who registered certain hardware and software or subscribed to official magazines and clubs. These re-releases are emulations of the original Nintendo 64 version. The emulated ports run at a resolution of 640×480, double that of the original, and support progressive scan. In November 2003, Ocarina of Time was ported to the iQue Player for a release in China as one of the five games available on its release.

In February 2007, Ocarina of Time was released for the Wii Virtual Console service for 1000 Wii Points. This version is also an emulation of the Nintendo 64 version. Because this version does not support controller vibration, the "Stone of Agony" item – which employs vibrations via the Rumble Pak controller accessory – has no function. A five-minute demo can be unlocked in Super Smash Bros. Brawl (2008). Ocarina of Time was rereleased on the Wii U Virtual Console worldwide on July 2, 2015, this time including the original controller vibration. It was also released on the Nintendo Classics service on October 25, 2021.

=== Remakes ===
==== Nintendo 3DS ====
In June 2011, Nintendo released Ocarina of Time 3D, a remake for the Nintendo 3DS handheld console. It was developed by Nintendo EAD with Grezzo, an independent Japanese studio headed by Koichi Ishii. It includes Master Quest and adds features including touchscreen and gyroscope controls, a "Boss Challenge" mode, instructional videos to guide stuck players, and a modified version of the Water Temple with reduced difficulty.

==== Nintendo Switch 2 ====
A remake of Ocarina of Time was released on the Nintendo Switch 2 on November 5, 2026. Changes include characters being fully voice acted in cutscenes, a freely-controllable camera, and the ability to sprint and manually jump, among others.

=== Master Quest ===
After completing Ocarina of Time, Nintendo developed a new version, Ura Zelda, for the 64DD, an add-on that expanded the N64 functionality with rewritable magnetic disks and online connectivity. The title Ura Zelda was commonly translated as "Another Zelda". It uses the same engine and plot of Ocarina of Time, but with increased difficulty and altered dungeons and puzzles, inspired by the "Second Quest" from the original The Legend of Zelda (1986). It also contains content cut from Ocarina due to time and storage constraints. Miyamoto said no online functions had been planned.

After Ura Zelda was completed, Nintendo chose not to release it due to the 64DD's limited distribution. They considered other ways to release it, such as promotions with game magazines, but it was never released on the N64 due to the expense of manufacturing cartridges. In 2002, Ura Zelda was ported to the GameCube, which uses less expensive optical discs, in Japan as Zeruda no Densetsu: Toki no Okarina GC Ura (ゼルダの伝説 時のオカリナ GC裏) and in 2003 in North America and Europe as The Legend of Zelda: Ocarina of Time Master Quest. According to Miyamoto, Ura Zelda was simple to port as it used few of the 64DD features.

==== Critical reception ====
Master Quest holds an average score of 89.50% on GameRankings and 91/100 on Metacritic. IGN's Peer Schneider gave it a mostly positive review, likening the concept to the second quest of the original Legend of Zelda. He said that some redesigned areas were poorer than in the original Ocarina of Time and speculated that they may have been constructed from "second choice" designs created during development. He described the port as graphically improved but with no substantial improvement to the frame rate, and that controls translated to the GameCube controller felt clumsy. Nonetheless, he summarized Master Quest as a "sweet surprise for any Zelda fan" and wrote that he would have recommended it even at full price. Zachary Lewis of RPGamer praised the revised puzzles, which require precise timing and find new uses for the Ocarina items, but wrote that players would be enthralled or frustrated by the increased difficulty.

== Reception ==
Reception

Aggregate scores
Aggregator	Score
GameRankings	98%
Metacritic	99/100 (Note: Based on 22 reviews)

Review scores
Publication	Score
AllGame	5/5
Computer and Video Games	5/5
Edge	10/10
Electronic Gaming Monthly	10/10, 10/10, 10/10, 10/10
Famitsu	10/10, 10/10, 10/10, 10/10
Game Informer	9.75/10
GamePro	5/5
GameRevolution	A
GameSpot	10/10
IGN	10/10
Next Generation	5/5
Nintendo Life	10/10
Nintendo Power	9.5/10
RPGamer	5/5

Awards
Publication	Award
CESA Award, Edge, EGM, Games, GameSpot, 2nd Annual Interactive Achievement Awards, Japan Media Arts Festival, MMCA, VSDA Award	Game of the Year
Computer and Video Games, Edge, Entertainment Weekly, GameTrailers, IGN, Metacritic, Next Generation, Nintendo Power, GameStats, GameFAQs, GamingBolt, VideoGamer, Game Informer, Slant, FHM, Joystik, PALGN VGChartz, Easy Allies,The Ringer, iHeartRadio, Game Informer, MobyGames,	Greatest Game of All Time
Computer and Video Games, IGN, The Age, GameFAQs, Entertainment Weekly, Stuff Magazine, Game, Official Nintendo Magazine, Empire Online, Stuff Magazine, GameFAQs, Power Unlimited, USA Today, Screen Rant	Greatest Game of All Time (Runner Up)

Ocarina of Time received perfect scores from the majority of reviews, including those in AllGame, CVG, Famitsu, Next Generation, Edge, Electronic Gaming Monthly, GameSpot, GamePro, GameRevolution, Nintendo Life, and IGN. It is the highest-reviewed game on the review aggregator website GameRankings, with an average score of 98%. It is one of only two games on Metacritic to have a score of 99/100 alongside Grand Theft Auto VI.

The reviews praised multiple aspects, particularly the level design, gameplay mechanics, sound, and cinematics. GameSpot reviewer Jeff Gerstmann wrote that Ocarina of Time is "a game that can't be called anything other than flawless", and IGN called it "the new benchmark for interactive entertainment" that could "shape the action RPG genre for years to come". Editors of GameTrailers called it a "walking patent office" due to the number of features it contains that became "industry standard". Scott Alan Marriott of AllGame described it as "completely unforgettable" and "an incredible adventure".

The graphics were praised for their depth and detail, although reviewers noted they were not always the best on N64. GameRevolution noted the characters' faces, the "toughest graphical challenge on 3D characters", saying that the characters' expressions and animation featured "surprising grace". IGN believed that Ocarina of Time improved on the graphics of Super Mario 64, giving a larger sense of scale. Impressive draw distances and large boss characters were also mentioned as graphical highlights. Reviewers praised the use of color and the visibility and detail of the environment, but felt some graphical elements did not perform as well as Banjo-Kazooie, a game released for the same platform earlier that year. IGN said that the frame rate and textures of Ocarina of Time were not as good as those of Banjo-Kazooie, particularly in the marketplace of Hyrule Castle, which was called "blurry".

Gameplay was generally praised as detailed, with many side quests to occupy players' time. IGN said players would be "amazed at the detail" of the environment and the "amount of thought that went into designing it". IGN praised the cinematics, citing great emotional impact and "flawless camera work". EGM enjoyed that Nintendo was able to take the elements of the older, 2D Zelda games and "translate it all into 3D flawlessly". Nintendo Power cited Ocarina of Time, along with Super Mario 64, as two games that "blazed trails" into the 3D era. The context-sensitive control system was seen as one of the strongest elements of the gameplay. Reviewers noted that it allowed for simpler control using fewer buttons but that it occasionally caused the player to perform unintended actions. The camera control was quoted as making combat "second nature", although the new system took time for the player to get used to.

The audio was generally well received, with IGN comparing some of Koji Kondo's pieces to the work of Philip Glass. Many atmospheric sounds and surround sound were designed to effectively immerse the player in the game world. Some reviewers complained that the audio samples sounded dated; others considered this a benefit, calling them "retro". GameRevolution called the sound "good for the Nintendo, but not great in the larger scheme of things" and noted that the cartridge format necessitated "MIDI tunes that range from fair to terrible". Pitchfork gave the soundtrack album 9 out of 10.

=== Sales ===
Assisted by a large marketing campaign, Ocarina of Time was a commercial success. In the United States, over 500,000 pre-orders were placed, more than tripling the number of pre-orders for any previous game, for which it was awarded the Guinness World Record for Most Advance Orders for a Game. Upon release, more than 1 million copies were sold there in less than a week. In 1998, 2.5 million copies were sold, although it was released only 39 days before the end of the year; it earned $150,000,000 (equivalent to $300,000,000 in 2025) in US revenues, higher than any Hollywood film in the last six weeks of 1998. In the United States, it was the best-selling video game of 1998 in dollar sales and the second best-selling game in unit sales (behind GoldenEye 007). In Japan, 920,000 copies were sold in 1998, becoming the eighth best-selling game of that year; a reported 386,234 copies were sold in its first week there, surpassing the 316,000 first-week sales of Metal Gear Solid.

In Europe, Ocarina of Time was the fifth best-selling game of 1998, grossing more than €39,000,000 or $44,000,000 (equivalent to $87,000,000 in 2025). In the UK, it was the fastest-ever-selling game until the release of Gran Turismo 2 in 2000, selling 61,232 copies during its first weekend. 1.14 million Nintendo 64 copies were sold in Japan and 7.6 million copies worldwide. By 2000, Ocarina of Time had sold 7 million cartridges and grossed about $400,000,000 (equivalent to $790,000,000 in 2025) worldwide.

=== Awards ===
In 1998, Ocarina of Time won the Grand Prize in the Interactive Art division at the Japan Media Arts Festival. Ocarina of Time won six awards at the 2nd Annual Interactive Achievement Awards: "Game of the Year", "Console Game of the Year", "Console Adventure Game of the Year", "Console Role-Playing Game of the Year", "Outstanding Achievement in Interactive Design", and "Outstanding Achievement in Software Engineering"; it also received a nomination for "Outstanding Achievement in Character or Story Development". At the BAFTA Interactive Entertainment Awards, Ocarina of Time won in four categories: "The Games Award" (precursor to the British Academy's "Best Game" award), "Innovative Game Award", "The Interactivity Award" and "The Computer Programming Award". Electronic Gaming Monthly gave it both the editors' choice and readers' choice awards for "Game of the Year for All Systems", "Nintendo 64 Game of the Year" and "Action RPG of the Year" as well as the readers' choice awards for "Best Music" and "Best Graphics", and it was runner-up for the reader's choice "Best Sound Effects" award. Edge gave it the awards for "Game of the Year" and "Gameplay Innovation" and placed it 2nd place for "Graphical Achievement" (behind Virtua Fighter 3tb).

== Legacy ==
Ocarina of Time was named the greatest video game of all time by Game Informer in 1999, Edge in 2000, Computer and Video Games in 2001, Nintendo Power in 2006, 2008 and 2012, IGN in 2008, Slant Magazine in 2015, FHM in 2010 and PALGN in 2005. In 2009, Edge named it the "best game to play today", writing: "Ocarina of Time is here in the list not because Nintendo had the power and wisdom to make a great game, but because it had the courage to make a unique one." In 2006, IGN UK readers voted it the greatest game, and in 2013 Edge readers voted it the best game released since Edge launched in 1993. In 2001, Electronic Gaming Monthly named it the eighth-greatest game. In 2009, Official Nintendo Magazine named it the second-greatest, behind Super Mario Bros, and Game Informer ranked it the 11th-greatest. In 2011, IGN readers voted Ocarina of Time the greatest Zelda game, behind Majora's Mask. In 2014, IGN named it the third-greatest Nintendo game.

IGN said in their review that "Ocarina of Time has aged extremely well", and said that while the textures and models look dated, the visual presentation was strong. GameRevolution said that although it has "noticeably aged compared to brand new RPGs ... it's still a terrific game", awarding it 91 out of 100. In 2007, the former GameSpot editor Jeff Gerstmann gave the Virtual Console port 8.9 out of 10: "Even after nine years, Ocarina of Time holds up surprisingly well, offering a lengthy and often-amazing adventure." RPGamer and Destructoid considered aspects of the graphics and audio outdated.

In November 2021, enthusiasts fully decompiled Ocarina of Time's ROM into human-readable C code. In March 2022, a group called "Harbour Masters" released a PC port under the name Ship of Harkinian, which includes widescreen support and an increased framerate, among other features.

=== Impact ===
Ocarina of Time popularized features such as a target lock system and context-sensitive buttons that have since become common elements in 3D adventure games. It is also credited with increasing the popularity of the ocarina.

Multiple members of the video game industry have expressed how the game influenced them and the industry. Former Rockstar Games vice president of creativity Dan Houser stated in 2012 that "anyone who makes 3-D games who says they've not borrowed something from Mario or Zelda [on the Nintendo 64] is lying". Rockstar founder and Grand Theft Auto director Sam Houser described Grand Theft Auto III as "Zelda meets Goodfellas". Ōkami director Hideki Kamiya (Capcom, PlatinumGames) said that he had been influenced by Zelda when he developed Ōkami. Soul Reaver and Uncharted director Amy Hennig (Crystal Dynamics and Naughty Dog) cited Zelda as an influence for the Legacy of Kain series, noting Ocarina of Time's influence on Soul Reaver. Nier director Yoko Taro cited Ocarina of Time as a major influence, writing, "When I first saw a third-person 3D action game with a semi-open world and progression systems, I was blown away by how it had 'everything.'"

Dark Souls creator Hidetaka Miyazaki (FromSoftware) said that "The Legend of Zelda became a sort of textbook for 3D action games". Ico director Fumito Ueda (Team Ico) cited Zelda as an influence on Shadow of the Colossus. Darksiders director David Adams (Vigil Games) cited Zelda as an influence on his work. CD Projekt Red (The Witcher, Cyberpunk 2077) cited Zelda as an influence on The Witcher series, including The Witcher 3: Wild Hunt (2015). Final Fantasy and The 3rd Birthday director Hajime Tabata (Square Enix) cited Ocarina of Time as inspiration for the seamless open world of Final Fantasy XV.
