= Water Temple =

Water Temple may refer to:

- Sunol Water Temple
- Pulgas Water Temple
- Water Temple (Ocarina of Time), a dungeon in the video game The Legend of Zelda: Ocarina of Time
- A building by Tadao Ando
