= Water Temple (Ocarina of Time) =

Fictional location in The Legend of Zelda

- The Legend of Zelda: Ocarina of Time location
- A map of the Water Temple
- First appearance: The Legend of Zelda: Ocarina of Time (1998)
- Created by: Eiji Aonuma

In-universe information
- Type: Dungeon
- Location: Lake Hylia
- Characters: Link, Tektite, Gold Skulltula, Keese, Like Like, Shell Blade, Stinger, Dark Link, Morpha; Master Quest only Dodongo, Lizalfos, Stalfos

The Water Temple is an area from the 1998 Nintendo 64 video game The Legend of Zelda: Ocarina of Time. It is the sixth dungeon encountered in the game. It was created by Ocarina of Time director Eiji Aonuma, who was inspired by his love of diving. It has players raising and lowering water levels to access different areas while utilizing a pair of Iron Boots to sink to the bottom. The difficulty of navigation combined with the cumbersome nature of using the Iron Boots led to several changes to the dungeon to assist players in the 2011 remake of Ocarina of Time, The Legend of Zelda: Ocarina of Time 3D. The difficulty players faced also caused Aonuma to apologize for the issues, while noting that the dungeon was not difficult so much as it was frustrating. Despite the criticism, some critics have been more forgiving, praising the Water Temple for its complexities.

== Concept and design ==
The Water Temple originally appeared in the 1998 Nintendo 64 video game The Legend of Zelda: Ocarina of Time. It is one of the levels that the protagonist Link explores as an adult. The temple was constructed to worship water spirits and was guarded by Zoras. It is found in Lake Hylia, which is at the time cursed by antagonist Ganondorf and an entity in the Water Temple, draining most of the lake. The dungeon is located underneath Lake Hylia and is a large, multi-leveled dungeon. Players raise and lower the water level in wings of the dungeon to access new areas. Link utilizes equipment to navigate the dungeon, including Iron Boots, a tunic that allows him to breathe underwater, and a Hookshot to hook onto distant objects. Link battles his alter-ego Dark Link in the Room of Illusion, which features shallow water and a lone tree on a patch of land. At the end, Link faces the dungeon's master, Morpha, a large water amoeba creature. Upon its defeat, Link warps to the Chamber of Sages, where the Sage of Water, Princess Ruto, bestows onto him the Water Medallion. Afterwards, Lake Hylia returns to normal. Another version of Ocarina of Time was released called The Legend of Zelda: Ocarina of Time Master Quest, which features harder versions of each dungeon, including the Water Temple. Game director Eiji Aonuma cited his love for deep-sea diving as his inspiration for the Water Temple, utilizing diving-based puzzles to reflect this.

== Reception ==
The 3DS version of Ocarina of Time added directions to the Water Temple, and made the Iron Boots easier to use, in response to criticism.

Since its appearance in Ocarina of Time, the Water Temple received negative reception for its high level of difficulty. GamesRadar called it one of the worst levels in any video game and stated that it prevented Ocarina of Time from being the best video game ever. Inverse found it to be a good example of a failed attempt at a water level and criticized the visual design and underwater physics. Game Informer disliked navigating it and felt that players would identify it as the worst part of Ocarina of Time. Authors Ennio De Nucci and Adam Kramarzewski discussed the controversy around the dungeon, questioning whether the designers understood its flaws during development. The Gameological Society writer Steve Heisler commented that the Water Temple, rather than being built around "spectacle", is built around "exhausting repetition".

Other critics felt more fondly of the level. Critics like Edge, Eurogamer, and Destructoid found its difficulty overstated. Edge felt that its challenge derived from players' difficulties in navigating the dungeon rather than the dungeon actually being difficult, while Eurogamer suggests that the relative newness of 3D gameplay contributed to this. It was held as one of the best dungeons in the series by Official Nintendo Magazine, GameZone, and Eurogamer, who called it representative of Japan's "mastery in the medium". Author Anthony Bean discussed the Water Temple's literal water cleansing following its completion as an analogue to Link's spiritual growth through his adult years. Bean also touched upon the Room of Illusion, discussing the lone tree in its center as potentially relating to both the Great Deku Tree and the Kokiri Forest, both of which Link has lost. He notes that Dark Link was reflective of Link challenging and accepting an undesirable aspect of himself as well as further representing Link's feelings of "loss and resentment".

=== Response to criticism ===
The Water Temple was the aspect of Ocarina of Time that Aonuma found most regrettable due to how it was received by players. The criticism it received led to Aonuma apologizing for its difficulty. In response to the criticism of the level, the designers of the 2011 Nintendo 3DS remake Ocarina of Time 3D sought to fix the level's issues. Shigeru Miyamoto felt that needing to pause to equip and unequip the Iron Boots in the Water Temple was cumbersome, leading them to fix this for the 3DS release by allowing players to do so without pausing. The level design remained the same, but was modified to feature red and green lights that direct players on the path to areas where they can raise or lower the water in the temple. Aonuma cited the Water Temple as one reason he wanted to create Ocarina of Time 3D, so that he could fix it. He felt that water levels like the Water Temple were a difficult thing for The Legend of Zelda designers to overcome. However, he disagreed that it was a difficult dungeon, arguing instead that managing the Iron Boots made it seem harder than it was. He still considers it one of his favorite The Legend of Zelda levels. Miyamoto teased Aonuma when an interviewer asked if players could skip Breath of the Wild's Water Temple, responding, "He didn't make the dungeons, so we're fine".
