= FuncoLand =

American video game retailer

Funco Inc.
- Type: Public
- Traded as: Nasdaq: FNCO
- Industry: Retail
- Founded: March 1988; 38 years ago, in Minneapolis, Minnesota, United States
- Founder: David R. Pomije
- Defunct: December 2000; 25 years ago
- Fate: Merged with Babbage's to form GameStop
- Successor: GameStop
- Headquarters: Eden Prairie, Minnesota, United States
- Number of locations: 406 (2000)
- Area served: United States (contiguous)
- Key people: David R. Pomije (chairman and CEO); Stanley Bodine (president and COO); Robert Hiben (CFO)
- Products: Video games; Consoles; Accessories
- Revenue: ▲US$2,527 million (2000); US$2,066 million (1999)
- Operating income: ▲US$15.6 million (1999); US$13.4 million (1998)
- Net income: ▼US$6.7 million (2000); US$9.7 million (1999)
- Total assets: ▲US$55.1 million (1999); US$45.6 million (1998)
- Total equity: ▲US$38.8 million (1999); US$33.5 million (1998)
- Number of employees: 1,500 (1999)
- Parent: Barnes & Noble (2000)
- Website: Funcoland.com (archive)

FuncoLand was an American video game retailer based in Eden Prairie, Minnesota, that specialized in selling new and used video game software. It is considered the first major video game retailer to allow consumers to sell and trade used video games. The chain's parent company Funco Inc. was established in the home of David R. Pomije in 1988, initially as a leaser of video games to video stores, and then as a mail-order business specializing in used video games. Upon the success of this venture, Pomije moved Funco to a Minneapolis warehouse, and began opening FuncoLand retail outlets nationwide.

Following Funco's initial public offering in 1992, the company experienced rapid growth spurred by the increasing momentum of the video game industry and the retailer's unique business model, which fended off any direct competitors. FuncoLand stores, which were often located in strip malls, featured sampling areas that allowed consumers to test a video game before its purchase, a practice that Pomije compared to the automobile industry. The retailer's considerable inventory of older titles no longer carried by larger national chain stores sometimes led competing retailers to refer customers to FuncoLand for such purchases. Marketing for FuncoLand included the self-published monthly magazine Game Informer, as well as a mail-order catalog and e-commerce platform.

Funco endured a downturn in the mid-1990s caused by an industry-wide slump, and in 1995, the company was subject to a shareholder suit accusing it of artificially inflating its stock price by overstating the capacity of its information systems to control the business; the suit was settled out of court in 1999. The fifth generation of video game consoles brought about the company's recovery, and the release of the Dreamcast granted a single-day sales record. Over the course of its lifespan, FuncoLand operated in 406 locations, and was twice listed by Fortune as one of America's fastest-growing businesses.

In April 2000, two of Funco's rivals – Electronics Boutique and Babbage's Etc. parent company Barnes & Noble – engaged in a bidding war for the company's purchase, concluding with Barnes & Noble's winning bid of $161.5 million. Funco was acquired by Barnes & Noble in June 2000, and was merged with Babbage's to form GameStop in December 2000.

== History ==
=== Origins, founding, and early development ===
In 1985, David R. Pomije established the mail-order company Protectronics, which initially sold Commodore 64 computers, but then transitioned to an eclectic array of consumer goods after the Commodore market dried. While the venture was initially successful, extravagant personal spending and lack of financial, operational and inventory control resulted in a Chapter 7 liquidation around March 1988. Pomije's leftover inventory included 1,100 Nintendo games, which he leased to video stores. To update the inventory, he began buying used games from mail-order businesses across the country. After a couple of encounters with particularly rude dealers, he was inspired to establish another mail-order company named Funco, and began advertising his offer to buy and sell used video games in industry magazines. During the Christmas 1989 season, he needed to install four telephone lines in his house to accommodate his growing business, and recruited his wife, father and uncle as staff members. The number of teenagers and young adults driving to Pomije's house to do business there was so great that one of his neighbors was suspicious and called the police.

In February 1990, Pomije moved Funco to a warehouse in the Minneapolis suburb of New Hope. In August 1990, he set up a small informal retail shop next to his office, which would be the first FuncoLand location. The following month, he began running an advertisement campaign in a daily Minneapolis newspaper, which attracted customers coming in from as far as Wisconsin and the Dakotas. Around this time, a Japanese company – which operated 330 stores in Japan similar to FuncoLand – inquired about a partnership with them. To gauge the company's interest, Pomije charged $10,000 just to read his business plan, but ultimately decided against a partnership. In late 1990, after sales reached $50,000, Funco opened two FuncoLand stores in Eden Prairie and Roseville to prepare for the coming Christmas season. They also became a sponsor for Christmas-season broadcasts of Gophers ice hockey games on KITN-TV.

=== Growth and national expansion ===
By December 1991, Funco had established 10 stores in the Minneapolis market. Pomije attributed the company's success to executives he lured from B. Dalton and Häagen-Dazs who had expertise in expanding into new markets. While these key hires – which include executive vice president Stanley Bodine, MIS director Michael Hinnenkamp and financial controller Robert Hiben – cost Funco a total of $519,779 in 1992, Pomije was willing to absorb the loss to ensure the presence of adequate information systems and financial controls that were absent in his previous business failure. By October 22, 1992, there were 29 FuncoLand locations between the Minneapolis, Chicago and Dallas areas, 190 employees within the company and a projection of $22 million in sales for the 1993 fiscal year. Pomije projected a total of 110 stores nationwide, 250 employees and sales of $63 million by March 1994.

On April 6, 1995, Funco announced that Bodine had been promoted to president and chief operating officer, replacing Pomije, who would remain as chairman and chief executive. Hiben was also named chief financial officer, while Hinnenkamp resigned from the company to pursue other career opportunities. In fiscal 1998, Funco launched an e-commerce service named the FuncoLand Superstore; after posting sales of $300,000 in its inaugural year, it quadrupled this figure the following year, making $1,572,000 in sales. In April 1999, Funco became one of the first companies to offer items for bidding at Amazon's short-lived Auctions service. On April 15, 1999, Navarre Corporation announced that it had reached an agreement with Funco to distribute consumer software to the company's e-commerce customers.

=== Acquisition and merger ===
On April 3, 2000, Funco rival Electronics Boutique Holdings Corp. agreed to purchase them for $110 million, paying $17.50 in cash for each of Funco's shares. The news of the acquisition was not surprising to analysts, as rumors of an imminent sale had been circulating since the previous summer; according to Bob Evans of the Craig-Hallum Capital Group, "Funco's stock has been depressed for some time, and they never seemed to get a high PE multiple, so we always thought one of the exit strategies would be the sale of the company". Electronics Boutique CEO Joseph Firestone remarked that his company had been "stalking" them for two years, and waited until the stock price was right. Following the announcement, Funco's stock price rose by more than 42% to $16.875 per share. On April 5, they received an unsolicited $135 million buyout offer from Barnes & Noble subsidiary Babbage's Etc., who offered to pay in either cash or a combination of cash and Barnes & Noble stock. The following day, Funco's stock price rose even further to $20.50 per share. On April 12, Funco gave Electronics Boutique five days to raise its offer before they would accept Barnes & Noble's offer. In response, Electronics Boutique matched Barnes & Noble's offer. On April 26, Barnes & Noble raised its bid to $161.5 million, or $24.75 a share, leaving Electronics Boutique with another five days to respond to the bid. On May 3, Electronics Boutique announced the withdrawal of its bid, and Funco accepted Barnes & Noble's buyout the following day. Electronic Boutique's original definitive agreement with Funco included a breakup fee of $3.5 million, the cost of which was covered by Barnes & Noble. Pomije grossed an estimated $35 million for his stock and options, and left the company to focus on developing the secondhand golf equipment retailer Second Swing, in which he was a majority shareholder.

Barnes & Noble's acquisition of Funco was completed on June 14, 2000, and Babbage's became a wholly owned subsidiary of Funco thereafter. In November 2000, Funco's Eden Prairie headquarters were phased out, with some functions being moved to the Babbage's headquarters in Dallas; Bodine had also departed the company. Funco and Babbage's were merged to form GameStop in December, and an initial public offering for the new company was completed on February 12, 2002. Many of the stores owned by GameStop continued to operate under the FuncoLand, Babbage's and Software Etc. names until 2003, by which time all stores in major markets were rebranded under the GameStop banner.

== Business operations ==
=== Products and services ===
FuncoLand specialized in selling new and used video games and equipment; it was considered the first major retailer to allow consumers to sell and trade used video games. The used games were often sold for 50% less than new copies, and customers could sell used video games for either money or store credit that could be used to purchase other games. The value of a trade-in varied between 10 cents and $55; Funco changed the offered prices for games twice a month, much like the stock market does for commodities. During 1990, the names, prices and supplies of games were charted by hand on a whiteboard in the New Hope warehouse; Pomije converted this method to a computerized format in 1991.

The company's total inventory included around 500 million video game cartridges, some of which were rare collector's items no longer sold by their manufacturers. Pomije remarked that competitors such as Toys "R" Us would sometimes refer customers to FuncoLand if they requested older games no longer carried by the larger chains. New games carried a 90-day warranty, which also applied to hardware and accessories. FuncoLand additionally sold cleaning kits for removing oxidation and dust from game cartridges; a game's warranty could be extended from 90 days to a year if purchased with a cleaning kit. Pomije compared the chain's policy of trading used games and testing new ones to the practices of the automobile industry, saying "You wouldn't buy a new car without driving it around the block". Company officials preferred to use the term "previously played" in reference to used games, as "used", according to Hiben, carried a connotation of wearing out.

=== Store format and customer engagement ===
FuncoLand stores ranged from 1,000 to 3,000 square feet in size, with the average store being approximately 1,650 square feet. The stores typically employed three to five workers apiece and were often located in strip malls, usually near major regional malls and national chain stores such as Toys "R" Us, Target and Best Buy. Each store cost around $55,000 to build and stock, and they carried an average of 1,700 items, 10% of which consisted of accessories. The stores were equipped with several television monitors displaying operating video games, as well as sampling areas that allowed consumers to test games within the store. FuncoLand employed around 1,500 full-time and part-time employees by November 21, 1999. The chain would recruit temporary part-time employees during seasonal peak periods. All store locations were leased, typically for an initial three-year term and with varying options for renewal. In addition to its retail outlets, Funco leased a 50,000 square foot distribution center and office facility in Eden Prairie, where its corporate headquarters was located.

Funco's marketing focused primarily on television advertising, with support from newspaper ads and inserts, in-store promotions and direct mail. The company also took advantage of special promotions of major titles in conjunction with game manufacturers; in 1993, promotions of Mortal Kombat, Madden NFL '94 and NBA Jam successfully introduced many consumers to FuncoLand's concept. In 1992, Funco began publishing Game Informer, a monthly magazine that included reviews of new games, which reached a circulation of over 195,000 by March 1999. The magazine was published by Sunrise Publications, Inc., a wholly owned subsidiary of Funco. The company also distributed a mail-order catalog every other month to approximately 60,000 customers who generally lived in geographic areas not served by FuncoLand stores, allowing them to purchase video games and equipment from the company's headquarters. Funco's e-commerce platform, the FuncoLand Superstore, included schedules for newly arriving games and reviews of new and classic games. Trademarked slogans that were deemed important to the company's marketing efforts include "Experience the Fun at FuncoLand", "Your Source for Interactive Entertainment", "Bring Home the Fun", "America's Place To Shop For Video Games", and "More Video Games at Half the Price".

== Corporate affairs ==
=== Competition ===
As the leading purveyor of used video games by 1993, FuncoLand's initial competition was limited primarily to independent shops and smaller regional chains; on the advent of 1993, the company was reported to have no competitors within the Minneapolis and Chicago areas, and one competing firm within Dallas. Funco's head start in establishing its concept and the difficulty in emulating it allowed the company to enter major metropolitan markets before the arrival of any serious competition. Over time, the video game retailing business grew to include mass merchandisers such as Target, Walmart and Kmart, computer software retailers such as Babbage's Etc. and Electronics Boutique, toy retailers including Toys "R" Us and KB Toys, consumer electronics retailers such as Best Buy and Circuit City, department store chains, and other entertainment product retailers. Because a number of these chains – particularly the computer software retailers – featured trade-in opportunities for previously played products, Funco never ruled out the possibility of these retailers (many of whom were larger than FuncoLand) moving more aggressively into the used game market and becoming direct competitors. Aside from continuing to compete with smaller companies such as It's About Games and MicroPlay, Funco also competed with video rental shops such as Blockbuster and Hollywood Video, which rented or sold used video games.

=== Store expansion ===
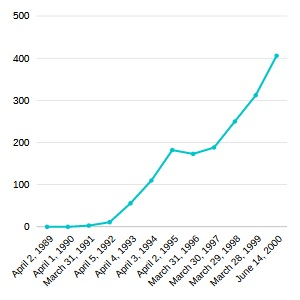
Barring a slump in the mid-1990s, FuncoLand's growth was rapid, accumulating over 400 stores from its 1988 establishment to its 2000 acquisition.

From fiscal 1991 to fiscal 1993, FuncoLand grew from three retail stores to 56 locations; In its 1993 annual report, Funco attributed this rapid growth to the increasing momentum of the video game industry and the retailer's unique niche and model. The company's first store outside the Minneapolis–Saint Paul area was opened in Dallas in April 1992. On July 13, 1992, it opened the first Chicago-area location in Bloomingdale. On September 22 and 25, 1992, it opened the first south suburban Chicago-area locations in Orland Park and Matteson respectively. FuncoLand opened its first Milwaukee-area store in January 1993.

On May 11, 1993, the first FuncoLand location in McHenry County, Illinois opened in Crystal Lake, bringing its total number of locations to 62. By June 1994, the retailer expanded into the East Coast with locations in the New York, Philadelphia and Washington–Baltimore areas, making for a total of 117 stores. Locations in Boston, Houston and Kansas City were also established during fiscal 1995. The chain opened 72 additional stores throughout fiscal 1995, and the company stated that it planned to open 120 new stores over the next two years. However, an industry-wide slump and a nosedive in the company's stock price resulted in the cancellation of these planned openings, leaving the total number of stores at the end of 1995 at 182.

The company experienced renewed prosperity during 1996 and successfully expanded into the West Coast by opening nine stores in the San Francisco Bay Area, inspiring it to increase the pace of opening new stores by planning to open 40 within 1997. Funco's West Coast expansion continued into fiscal 1998, in which it opened its first Greater Sacramento location on June 28, 1997, as well as eight locations in Seattle. During the same period, the first Greater Cincinnati locations were opened in October 1997, and additional markets were established in Columbus, St. Louis, Indianapolis and Louisville. FuncoLand's 300th location was opened in Nashville on November 28, 1998. Other markets opened in fiscal 1999 include Los Angeles, Hampton Roads, Richmond, Austin, San Antonio, Memphis, and Pittsburgh.

FuncoLand's final store count at the time of its acquisition was reported at 406. Within the chain's lifespan, Fortune had twice listed it as one of the fastest-growing businesses in America, once in 1994 and again in 1998.

=== Financial performance ===
After establishing Funco as a mail-order company from his house, Pomije made $35,000 by March 1989. Sales from then to March 1990 were $375,000. In September 1990, a month after Pomije set up a retail outlet next to the company's warehouse, a successful advertising campaign in a daily Minneapolis newspaper resulted in $25,000 in sales for Funco within two days. During the Christmas 1990 season, the budding retail chain, which now included two additional stores, made sales of over $260,000.

On July 2, 1992, Funco reported that it filed a registration statement with the U.S. Securities and Exchange Commission for an initial public offering of one million shares of its common stock at $5 a share, with plans to use the proceeds from the sold shares to repay short-term debt and finance the opening of other FuncoLand locations. Its initial public offering, which was underwritten by Miller, Johnson & Kuehn Inc., was announced on August 12, 1992. From its initial public offering onward, its stock price rose and peaked at $17.75 a share around February 11, 1993 before steadily dropping to $8 a share by April 23. Miller, Johnson & Kuehn analyst Steven Hosier acknowledged that Funco's stock was becoming pricey, and attributed the stock's most recent weakness to Sega of America's April 14 announcement of a joint venture with Time Warner and Tele-Communications Inc.; their unveiling of the Sega Channel, an interactive cable channel that would allow subscribers to download and sample new Sega games, was interpreted by investors as an impending obsolescence of the retail outlet concept.

On December 15, 1994, Funco announced that it would increase promotional spending and aggressive price cuts in response to heavy competition caused by a price war between Circuit City and Best Buy, which influenced retailers such as Musicland and Target to lower the price of new releases. Funco reported that as a result of this measure, its third-quarter earnings would fall below analysts' expectations. The next day, its stock plummeted by 46.5% down to $5.75 a share. Regardless, they anticipated record sales for the fourth quarter, and stated that it had met its store-opening objectives for the year. On April 6, 1995, the company reported that its fourth-quarter sales dropped 24% from the same period the previous year. As a result, its stock price dropped 16.2% to its then-lowest point of $3.87 1/2 per share the following day. They stated that its fourth-quarter results were adversely impacted by comparison against the previous year's strong fourth-quarter video game release of NBA Jam, as well as an industry-wide slump caused by consumers deferring purchases in anticipation of upcoming next-generation video game consoles. The chain declared an intent to focus on increasing sales in existing markets and improving expense controls and margins during the industry's recovery. In a bid to offset market forces, Pomije cut his $180,000 salary in half, Bodine took a 40% cut, and salary increases for other senior officials were frozen. Additionally, the headquarters staff was reduced by 20% to 100 employees, and work schedules were tightened to avoid overstaffing. As a result, general and administrative expenses decreased by 1.5% to $1.8 million. For the 1996 fiscal year, Funco posted a 1.3% increase in revenue, which they attributed to its management's margin improvement initiatives as well as stronger fourth-quarter sales compared to the previous year.

After trading at $2.62 1/2 per share on January 11, 1996, the company's stock price climbed to $14.12 1/2 per share by January 17, 1997. Pomije and industry analysts attributed its revenue growth to the revitalization of the video game industry brought about by the popularity of the Nintendo 64, PlayStation and Sega Saturn consoles and related products. Upon the September 1999 United States launch of the Dreamcast console, the retailer set a single-day sales record, and high demand for the console boosted their second-quarter earnings for the 2000 fiscal year to $52.7 million, 49.2% higher than the previous second-quarter's earnings. The company's net income of $716,000 was nearly double analysts' estimates. On December 21, 1999, they reported that a "significant softening" of December sales would result in third-quarter sales and earnings falling below analysts' expectations. They attributed this projected decline to a shortage of high-demand products such as the Game Boy Color handheld console and the video game Pokémon Yellow, as well as a lack of major title releases for the Nintendo 64 and PlayStation compared to the previous year and price-discounting on consoles by competitors. Funco warned that the sales and earnings slowdown would linger until the following fall, when the highly anticipated PlayStation 2 would be released.

Year ending	Net sales	Gross profit	Operating income	Net income	Total assets	Shareholders' equity	Net income per share	Stores
Year ending	US$							Stores
April 2, 1989	38,842	—N/a	—N/a	6,622	37,424	6,722	—N/a	0
April 1, 1990	299,116	—N/a	—N/a	3,528	137,667	10,250	—N/a	0
March 31, 1991	2,518,985	1,172,294	92,374	84,579	404,942	94,829	0.03	3
April 5, 1992	7,069,503	3,342,989	29,721	20,527	1,974,808	202,180	0.01	11
April 4, 1993	20,533,944	8,792,599	-464,257	-519,779	7,553,432	4,483,873	-0.12	56
April 3, 1994	50,490,000	21,047,000	1,256,000	880,000	24,707,000	18,653,000	0.15	110
April 2, 1995	80,365,000	31,285,000	-1,328,000	-1,275,000	23,160,000	17,800,000	-0.22	182
March 31, 1996	81,382,000	33,692,000	547,000	205,000	25,668,000	18,071,000	0.03	173
March 30, 1997	120,555,000	44,436,000	7,583,000	5,350,000	31,745,000	24,318,000	0.86	188
March 29, 1998	163,316,000	56,688,000	13,430,000	8,270,000	45,626,000	33,525,000	1.26	250
March 28, 1999	206,673,000	67,980,000	15,601,000	9,710,000	55,140,000	38,836,000	1.53	312
April 2, 2000	252,700,000	—N/a	—N/a	6,700,000	—N/a	—N/a	1.08	—N/a

== Litigation ==
On August 17, 1995, a putative class action shareholder suit against Funco, entitled Christopher Cannon v. Funco, Inc. and David R. Pomije, was filed in the United States District Court for the District of Minnesota. Cannon, purporting to represent a class of all purchasers of Funco's common stock during the period of May 18, 1994 through December 15, 1994, alleged that the company artificially inflated its stock price by overstating the capacity of its information systems to control the business. On October 18, 1996, the court dismissed the state common law claims with prejudice and dismissed the federal securities claim without prejudice. On January 6, 1997, Cannon filed an amended complaint repeating his previous allegations while asserting various claims under the Securities Exchange Act of 1934, seeking an unspecified amount of damages plus costs and attorney's fees. After Funco and Pomije filed a motion to dismiss the complaint in its entirety, the involved parties negotiated and reached an agreement in principle to settle the suit out of court. A settlement for $900,000 minus $202,000 in attorney's fees was approved by the court on April 30, 1999.
