= Gameswizards =

Australian retail chain

- Type: Public
- Industry: Video games
- Founded: January 1990 (Re-branded 2007)
- Headquarters: Castle Hill
- Products: Software; Computer hardware Game consoles Computer games

Gameswizards, previously known as The Games Wizards, was an Australian retailer which specialised in selling computer software, hardware and video game products. The company was established in Australia in January 1990. In 2006 the company was acquired by The Game Group PLC and re-branded as Game stores.

== History ==
Games Wizards was founded in 1990, and by 1999 had 7 stores in New South Wales and the Australian Capital Territory. In 2004 it received financial backing from Crescent Capital, and renamed itself from The Games Wizards to simply Gameswizards. By 2006, Gameswizards had expanded to 14 stores and 8 franchise stores across Australia's East coast.

== Game acquisition ==
On 19 September 2006 The Game Group PLC, Europe's largest retailer of computer and video games, acquired Gameswizards for A$3.8 million. Game went on to acquire all of the franchise stores, and all pre-existing Gameswizards stores made the change over to the Game brand before the end of April 2007. The company followed the aggressive growth strategy of its UK parent and by 2007 the chain had grown to 49 stores nationwide. The growth continued to 118 stores by 2009. Management changes in 2010 saw the number of stores reduced by 26.

Following the 2012 problems of parent company, Game UK, the separate company governing Game Australia, started to suffer the same financial and stock problems.

Game Australia (trading as TGW Pty Ltd) entered into administration on 14 May 2012.

On 25 May 2012, Pricewaterhouse Coopers, the administrators of Game Australia, announced that it had made 264 staff redundant and closed 60 stores. An expected further round of redundancies and closures was confirmed on 19 June 2012 when the administrators announced that 16 of the remaining 31 stores would close for good the same day and that the remaining 15 would close over the coming weeks, marking the end of Game Australia.

== See also ==
Game (British retailer)
