= Game Informer =

American monthly video game magazine

- The July 2011 issue's cover
- Editor: Matt Miller
- Former editors: Elizabeth Olson; Andy McNamara; Andrew Reiner
- Categories: Video game
- Frequency: Every 5 weeks (10 per year)
- Publisher: FuncoLand (1991–2000); GameStop (2000–2024); Gunzilla Games (2025–present)
- Total circulation: 8 million (2011); 7,585,296 (2017)
- First issue: August 1991; 35 years ago
- Country: United States
- Based in: Minneapolis
- Language: English
- Website: www.gameinformer.com
- ISSN: 1067-6392
- OCLC: 870151871

Game Informer (GI) (Note: Most often stylized gameinformer from the 2010s onward. Previous title stylizations included GAME INFORMER in the 1990s, and GAMEINFORMER in the 2000s, though the latter has also appeared on some issues as recently as 2020, most often when using a special stylization to mimic the logo of the cover-story game.) is an American monthly video game magazine featuring articles, news, strategy, and reviews of video games and game consoles. It debuted in August 1991, when the video game retailer FuncoLand started publishing an in-house newsletter. It was acquired by the retailer GameStop, which bought FuncoLand in 2000. Due to this, a large amount of promotion was done in-store, which contributed to the success of the magazine. As of June 2017, it was the fifth-most popular magazine by copies circulated.

In August 2024, GameStop discontinued Game Informer after 33 years of publication and 368 issues. The associated website was also shut down with its digital archive removed. In March 2025, Game Informer announced that it had been acquired by Gunzilla Games and established as its own business. The relaunch included a revival of the magazine's website, the restoration of the digital archive, and brought back all of Game Informer's laid off staff. Game Informer also restarted the publication of the print magazine in June 2025.

== History ==
=== Origins and GameStop (1991–2025) ===
==== Magazine ====
Game Informer debuted in August 1991. David R. Pomijie, owner of FuncoLand, decided to launch a magazine as a better way to spend "advertising dollars". The first editor-in-chief (EIC) was Elizabeth Olson with Andy McNamara as her editorial assistant. In 1993, Olson and McNamara jointly became coeditors-in-chief; with the release of issue sixteen, McNamara became the sole EIC. Game Informer was published every two months until November 1994, when the magazine began to be released monthly.

Game Informer covers, c. 2005

In 2000, Barnes & Noble acquired and merged several companies which led to the formation of GameStop Corp.; that year, both FuncoLand and Game Informer were purchased by GameStop. In 2001, Cathy Preston became the magazine's publisher; Preston had been working as part of the production team since 2000. It was under her that the publication became an integral part of GameStop's customer loyalty program, Power Up Rewards. In 2019, McNamara was still the magazine's EIC. In 2020, Preston retired from Game Informer after 20 years. Mary Lugones took over the role as publisher for Game Informer.

In 2010, Game Informer became the 5th largest magazine in the US with 5 million copies sold, ahead of popular publications like Time, Sports Illustrated, and Playboy. By 2011, Game Informer had become the 3rd largest magazine in the US, topping 8 million copies circulated. However, in 2014 it had fallen to 4th place with 6.9 million copies sold. Figures in 2017 placed the magazine at 4th place with over 7 million copies sold. The financial success of Game Informer has been attributed to its good relationship with publishers, ties to GameStop, and the lack of gaming-magazine competition.

In August 2019, after months of declining financials for GameStop, about half of the current Game Informer staff were let go, part of the larger cut of more than 120 jobs by GameStop as part of the store's effort to improve their financial performance. These included some staff members that had been working at Game Informer for over 10 years, some were out on vacation during the time of the layoff. As a result of the layoff, other Game Informer staff also left of their own will, including video editor Ben Hanson. Ben Hanson eventually started his own podcast called MinnMax, in the process recruiting some of the Game Informer staff that was laid off. In March 2020, there was again another set of layoffs at Game Informer, this time not affecting editors but instead people who worked in other departments of Game Informer.

In late June 2020, longtime EIC McNamara announced he was leaving Game Informer, to be the Global Director of Integrated Comms for Shooters & Star Wars at Electronic Arts, and that former senior editor Andrew Reiner would be taking his place as EIC. McNamara, who had at the time stopped reviewing games for Game Informer, instead focused solely on writing stories and behind the scenes work, came back to give his final review, The Last of Us Part II. After leaving Game Informer, he eventually said that the layoffs had a big impact on his decision to move on.

On November 4, 2021, the official website announced that every issue from then on would have a small print run variant known as Game Informer Gold. This version uses high quality paper and an alternate cover and is limited to 50 copies. The first copy was given away on November 6 for their Extra Life charity livestream.

In July 2022, three more Game Informer staff were laid off: John Carson, Wesley LeBlanc, and Creative Director Jeff Akervik, who had worked at the publication for over 14 years. Later that month, LeBlanc was rehired after the departure of Jill Grodt. Andrew Reiner left Game Informer in September 2022 to become a game developer, thus leaving Game Informer with no original staff. Matt Miller, who has worked at Game Informer since 2004, was promoted to EIC. In Fall 2022, Kyle Hilliard (who was previously laid off) returned.

Game Informer launched a new print magazine subscription, standalone from GameStop's Power Up Rewards, in March 2024. The program, which launched at a special annual price of $19.91 (commemorating the company's founding year), offers 10 print issues per year and digital magazine access.

On August 2, 2024, GameStop leadership abruptly shuttered the publication and laid off its staff. The publication's website was replaced with a static "farewell" page, making old articles unreadable. The July 2024 issue was its 368th and final issue. Current and former staff bemoaned the sudden closure. Morgan Park of PC Gamer reported that GameStop announced the shutdown publicly on the Game Informer X account, however, the "Game Informer staff suggested they had nothing to do with the brief, cringey statement that reads like ChatGPT output". Park highlighted that the Game Informer X account went briefly active on August 5, 2024, when "a former Game Informer staffer seemingly took the reins one last time to share a proper farewell" which included images of the Game Informer masthead; after this farewell was posted, the Game Informer X account was wiped and "no longer exists, just like the website. It seems GameStop didn't appreciate Game Informer wanting to go out on its own terms". Aftermath then published a roundup from former Game Informer staff to eulogize the magazine in their own words.

==== Website ====
Game Informer Online was originally launched in August 1996 and featured daily news updates as well as articles. Justin Leeper and Matthew Kato were hired on in November 1999 as full-time web editors. As part of the GameStop purchase of the magazine, this original GameInformer.com site was closed around January 2001.

GI Online was revived, at the same domain name, in September 2003, with a full redesign and many additional features, such as a review database, frequent news updates, and exclusive "Unlimited" content for subscribers. It was managed by Billy Berghammer, creator of PlanetGameCube.com (now known as NintendoWorldReport.com). In 2010, Berghammer was the editor-in-chief at EGM Media Group.

In March 2009, the online staff began creating the code for what would be the latest redesign to date. The redesign was to release hand-in-hand with the magazine's own redesign. On October 1, 2009, the newly redesigned website was live, with a welcome message from Editor-In-Chief Andy McNamara. Many new features were introduced, including a rebuilt media player, a feed highlighting the site activity of the website's users, and the ability to create user reviews. At the same time, the magazine's podcast, The Game Informer Show, was launched.

When the magazine folded in 2024, the website's content was deleted and replaced with a splash page announcing the closure for any links to the website. Aftermath reported that there are independent archival projects "in the works".

==== Australian edition ====
In November 2009, Game Informer was launched in Australia by former Australian GamePro, Gameplayer and Official PlayStation Magazine editor Chris Stead and publisher Citrus Media. By June 2010, Game Informer Australia had become the first local games publication to pass 10,000 subscribers. By August 18, 2010, it had become Australia's biggest-selling video games publication.

Game Informer Australia was closed down on April 18, 2019, as a result of cost-cutting measures from its publishing company EB Games Australia. GI Australia editor David Milner noted on Twitter that despite the fact that "readership was up 19% over the last year", that "Recent ad sales, however, did not really reflect this"; he also noted the failed attempt at EB Games Australia's corporate parent GameStop to find a buyer after months on the market, causing their shares to drop.

=== Relaunch (2025–present) ===
On March 19, 2025, Game Informer shared a short video on its social media channels "featuring the publication's farewell message"; this video included code, resembling an arcade game, at the bottom of the screen with the word "Continue" and ended with the date March 25 flashed, "suggesting a launch or announcement". Former Game Informer staff also shared this video, with former director Brian Shea stating he could not "comment at this time but encouraged checking out the social media posts of his former colleagues". Then on March 25, 2025, Game Informer announced that Gunzilla Games, developers of Off the Grid, had purchased Game Informer and hired back the staff that had been laid off at its initial shutdown. They relaunched the website and digital archive with new articles and reviews for games that released during their initial shutdown. In June 2025, they also restarted the publication of the print magazine.

== Features and reviews ==
Game Informer reviewed games since the early 16-bit era. The magazine has reviewed games on PCs, consoles (including PlayStation 5, PlayStation 4, PlayStation VR, Xbox Series X, Xbox One, Nintendo Switch 2 and Nintendo Switch) and mobile devices running Android and iOS. Game Informer used to give separate reviews of the same game for each console for which that game was released; starting in the mid-2000s, GI has published just one consolidated review for the game, while providing notes on the pros and cons of each version. Older games, three per issue, were given brief reviews in the magazine's "Classic GI" section (compared with the game's original review score, if one exists). This was discontinued in 2009, months before the redesign of the magazine. The magazine's staff members rate games on a scale of 1 to 10 with quarter-point intervals. A score of 1 to 5 is considered terrible (in many issues, 1 is noted as a joke reason for the score, for instance, "Duplicates in lootboxes" in issue 295); 6 to 7 is "average", a decently playable, and sometimes fun (but flawed) game; and 10 is a rare, "outstanding", nearly perfect game.

Annually, Game Informer's editors counted and judged the "Top 50 Games of [last year]". The games were sorted in order of release date. They do not have rankings, but they did commemorate special games with awards like Game of the Year and other examples. They also had top ten charts of differing categories, both in the "Top 50" section of the website and in the regular magazine. Game Informer also annually included an "E3 Hot 50", a special section that reviews the year's E3 (Electronic Entertainment Expo) and most to all of its games, which also temporarily replaced the "Previews" section of the print edition.

=== Game of the Year winners ===
| Year | Game | Ref. |
|---|---|---|
| 1991 | —N/a | |
| 1992 | Street Fighter II | |
| 1993 | Mortal Kombat | |
| 1994 | Donkey Kong Country | |
| 1995 | Donkey Kong Country 2: Diddy's Kong Quest | |
| 1996 | Super Mario 64 | |
| 1997 | Final Fantasy VII | |
| 1998 | The Legend of Zelda: Ocarina of Time | |
| 1999 | Tony Hawk's Pro Skater | |
| 2000 | Tony Hawk's Pro Skater 2 | |
| 2001 | Metal Gear Solid 2: Sons of Liberty | |
| 2002 | Grand Theft Auto: Vice City | |
| 2003 | The Legend of Zelda: The Wind Waker | |
| 2004 | Halo 2 | |
| 2005 | Resident Evil 4 | |
| 2006 | The Legend of Zelda: Twilight Princess | |
| 2007 | BioShock | |
| 2008 | Grand Theft Auto IV | |
| 2009 | Uncharted 2: Among Thieves | |
| 2010 | Red Dead Redemption | |
| 2011 | The Elder Scrolls V: Skyrim | |
| 2012 | Mass Effect 3 | |
| 2013 | The Last of Us | |
| 2014 | Dragon Age: Inquisition | |
| 2015 | The Witcher 3: Wild Hunt | |
| 2016 | Overwatch | |
| 2017 | The Legend of Zelda: Breath of the Wild | |
| 2018 | God of War | |
| 2019 | Control | |
| 2020 | The Last of Us Part II | |
| 2021 | Halo Infinite | |
| 2022 | Elden Ring | |
| 2023 | The Legend of Zelda: Tears of the Kingdom | |
| 2024 | Astro Bot | |
| 2025 | Clair Obscure: Expedition 33 | |

=== Other features ===
The April edition of Game Informer includes 'an annual feature Game Infarcer, an April Fools' Day prank. In the cover box head appears "World's #1 Pretend Magazine" where would ordinarily appear "World's #1 Video Game Magazine" -- "Parody" is found at the cover bottom. Game Infarcer articles are accredited to the fictional editor-in-chief Darth Clark, who is addressed in hate mail every year sent to Game Informer. The heated responses to parody articles are often featured in later Game Informer issues.

Game Informer has included four "Sacred Cow Barbecues". Similar in style to a celebrity roast, the occasion is meant to "knock some of gaming's most revered icons off their high and mighty pedestals". The first Sacred Cow Barbecues featured in issue 158 (June 2006). Other issues featuring Sacred Cow Barbecues are: 183 (July 2008), 211 (November 2010), and 261 (January 2015). Sacred Cow Barbecues articles are considered controversial among those gamers who are not amused by their favorite games being mocked.
