= Gamestation =

Defunct UK-based video game retailer

- Type: Private
- Industry: Video games
- Founded: 1993; 33 years ago
- Defunct: 2012; 14 years ago
- Fate: Merged into Game
- Successor: Game
- Headquarters: Basingstoke, Hampshire, United Kingdom
- Key people: Steven Hall; Julian Gladwin (co founders)
- Products: Games Consoles; Computer Games; Accessories
- Website: gamestation.co.uk

Gamestation was a chain of retail shops in the United Kingdom selling used and new video games. It was the second largest specialist video game retailer in the United Kingdom until it was acquired by Game in May 2007, a group which owns many different gaming stores throughout the United Kingdom and Europe. In March 2012, the Game Group went into administration and a number of Gamestation stores, including the company's flagship store in Birmingham New Street were closed.

Game and Gamestation were purchased from the administrators by OpCapita. On 14 September 2012, it was announced that the Gamestation brand would disappear with all stores being rebranded as Game. On 18 November 2012, the Gamestation website closed and redirected to that of Game.

The defunct brand is currently owned by Frasers Group, following its purchase of Game in June 2019.

== History ==
=== Foundation and sale to Blockbuster ===
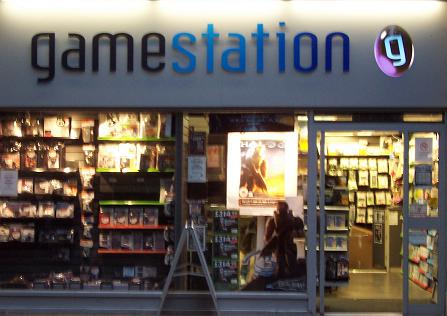
A high-street Gamestation store.

Gamestation was founded in 1993 in York, and by 2002, it had 64 stores across the United Kingdom. In October 2002, Gamestation was sold during the peak sales period of PlayStation 2, to American video rental giant Blockbuster who invested heavily in an aggressive store roll out program. This, coupled with competitive pricing subsidised by the buoyant video rental market of the time, elevated the chain to second highest market share in the games industry; behind Game.

2006 saw their American parent company file massive debts in the region of $560 million, leading to widespread speculation that the company was either rife to a take over or teetering on the edge of administration, however Gamestation was in fact still making healthy profits, Blockbuster went through a process of consolidation and sold any outlets not branded 'Blockbuster' in an effort to concentrate on its core business.

=== Sale to GAME ===
Blockbuster Inc. announced on 2 May 2007 that it had sold Gamestation Ltd. to British based Game Group Plc for about £75 million ($150 million). 217 Gamestation stores were sold in the deal. Gamestation's smaller "concession" stores, that operated inside of some Blockbuster stores, were not involved in the Game takeover and were instead owned by Blockbuster exclusively.

These stores were re-branded as 'Blockbuster Games' stores and no longer operated under the Gamestation identity. The Gamestation brand was run in parallel with the parent company's Game brand.

== Operations ==
Gamestation was based at Unity House in Basingstoke from 2009 until its demise.

Online operations were operated through Gamestation.co.uk, originally managed by Game Group's acquisition Gameplay GB ltd in 2004. Pricing structures were similar to the groups other websites, but maintains the Gamestation identity. As of May 2012, the websites for both Game and Gamestation are run by Game Retail Ltd.

On 29 February 2012, it was announced that both Game and Gamestation would no longer stock new titles from Electronic Arts. This is due to the major games distributor refusing to give the company reduced rates and/or rebates. This affected the pre orders of Mass Effect 3, due out the following week.

On 8 March 2012, it was reported that both Game and Gamestation were heavily discounting stock in an attempt to minimise any debts ahead of administration, and it was duly confirmed on 26 March 2012, that Game Group had entered administration with PricewaterhouseCoopers and Ian Shepard stepped down as CEO. As of November 2011, Gamestation had operated 232 stores throughout the United Kingdom, and 277 stores operating under both brands were instantly closed. All the Irish Game stores were closed.

On 31 March 2012, OpCapita officially made a deal to purchase the Group, taking on the 334 remaining stores and securing over 3,000 jobs.

== Deals and appeal ==
Until they bought Gamestation, Game were considered to be Gamestation's primary competitor. Gamestation's main method of attracting customers was to put on more special offers than its competitor as well as focusing on pre-owned games and large discounts on older titles.

The chain mainly focused on the sixth and seventh generation of consoles: PlayStation 3, Xbox 360, Wii, Nintendo DS, and PlayStation Portable, as well as Microsoft Windows and previous generations of consoles (such as PlayStation 2, Xbox, GameCube, and Game Boy Advance). They also sold, and accepted as part exchange, games and consoles from older generations, such as the Master System, Mega Drive, Sega Saturn, Dreamcast, NES, Super NES, Nintendo 64, and PlayStation. Game accessories for the older consoles were also available.

=== Christmas promotions ===
Gamestation advertised their Christmas promotions with the 'Fat Chris' character, which is a parody of Father Christmas (advertised as "What's half of Father Christmas?" – "Fat Chris!"). He was used for Christmas 2006 and 2007, and also reappeared in the 2008 Christmas advertising campaign. "Fat Chris" was portrayed by stand-up comedian Justin Moorhouse. In 2009, however, it was dropped with the shop promotions "starring" the branch manager of the particular store, to encourage the customers to talk to the staff and give the stores a more personal feel.

In 2010, Gamestation relaunched its Christmas campaign with a similar theme, "Talk to the Gamers". A campaign used to again encourage customers to come and talk to the staff in an attempt to be more personal. This promotion starred the "Faces of Gamestation." Four staff members from the Gamestation brand were chosen and used in both standard advertising and Christmas themed displays.

Mainly used in store and in newspapers. The original four staff members were Steve (Liverpool Lord Street), Robyn (Merry Hill), Amber (Bracknell), and Kevin (Reading). The response from this was quite popular so the idea was used again throughout 2011 with a different cast of staff. The campaign for Christmas in 2011 was themed "Welcome Home Gamers" with television adverts focused on people portraying family members, friends or the "Gamer" themselves coming in from the cold and finding what they needed in store.

=== April Fools' 2010 ===
On April Fools' Day 2010, Gamestation temporarily added a clause to its online sales contract claiming that "By placing an order via this Web site on the first day of the fourth month of the year 2010 Anno Domini, you agree to grant Us a non transferable option to claim, for now and for ever more, your immortal soul." Besides the humorous reference to a deal with the devil, the prank was meant to illustrate the problems with fine print in clickwrap license agreements that allow companies to hide unfavourable conditions from their consumers.
