= Future Zone (retailer) =

British video game retailer

Future Zone Stores Limited
- Industry: Video game retailer
- Founded: October 1992
- Defunct: January 1996
- Fate: Rebranded to Electronics Boutique
- Owner: The Rhino Group

Future Zone Stores Limited was a British gaming retailer, founded in 1992.

Future Zone was originally founded by Bev Ripley and Terry Norris as The Rhino Group in 1992, trading as Future Zone. In November 1993, The Rhino Group acquired the Virgin Games Centre chain from WHSmith, increasing its portfolio of Future Zone stores to 77. In 1995, 25% of the retailer's parent company, The Rhino Group, was purchased by Electronics Boutique, and all Future Zone stores were rebranded to the Electronics Boutique name. Electronics Boutique in the UK would then become Game in 2002.
