= Game (British retailer) =

British video game retailer

- Logo used since 2020
- Type: Subsidiary
- ISIN: GB00BMP36W19
- Industry: Retail
- Founder: Peter Wickins; Neil Taylor
- Headquarters: Shirebrook (UK and Ireland); Pozuelo de Alarcón, Madrid (Spain)
- Area served: United Kingdom; Ireland; Spain Former locations: Australia; Denmark; France; Norway; Portugal; Sweden
- Key people: Manuel Ballesteros (president, Spain)
- Products: Video games Video game accessories Video game merchandise
- Owner: Independent (1990–1999); The Electronics Boutique PLC (1999–2002); The Game Group PLC (2002–2012); OpCapita (2012–2019); Frasers Group (2019–present) (Note: Game Spain operated by GuideBridge Capital, using Game brand under license from Frasers Group)
- Parent: Frasers Group Trading Limited
- Website: www.game.co.uk www.game.es

Game (stylized GAME) is a British video game retailer founded in 1990, currently owned by Frasers Group. The business operates in the United Kingdom and Ireland through in-store concessions and the Internet, while a separate company, GuideBridge Capital, licenses the Game brand to hundreds of standalone stores across Spain.

Founded in 1990 by Peter Wickins and Neil Taylor, Game had grown to 86 stores across the UK when it was acquired in April 1999 by The Electronics Boutique PLC, the UK franchisee of Electronics Boutique. In April 2002, its parent company was rebranded as The Game Group PLC and all Electronics Boutique stores were rebranded to Game. Game expanded internationally during the 2000s, notably purchasing and rebranding Gameswizards in Australia, as well as acquiring various gaming store chains across Europe. In September 2006, its parent company purchased its main UK competitor, Gamestation.

In March 2012, Game subsequently entered administration, and was rescued by OpCapita the following week. The Australian business collapsed, and its Irish and European divisions (excluding Spain) were either sold or closed. By July 2014, OpCapita reported that Game had successfully returned to profitability. In September 2014, Spanish operations expanded, with the acquisition of previous GameStop locations.

In June 2019, OpCapita agreed to sell Game to Frasers Group for £52 million. By April 2026, all standalone Game stores in the UK had been gradually closed, with the brand repositioned as an online retailer and an in-store concession within Sports Direct and House of Fraser stores, including Lillywhites in Piccadilly Circus. Game Ireland was also reintroduced in a concession-based format within Sports Direct locations. In March 2025, Frasers Group sold Game’s Spanish operations to GuideBridge Capital for an undisclosed sum, with the brand continuing there under a licensing agreement.

== History ==
=== Formation ===
In April 1990, Game was founded by Peter Wickins and Neil Taylor who wanted to exploit the growing market for entertainment software and hardware. Initial growth was funded by the Taylor family and venture capital investors.

In November 1999, the British franchisee of Electronics Boutique purchased Game for £99 million; it had been formed in October 1995 by acquiring and rebranding the Future Zone retailer. Game had 86 stores at the time of the takeover, and the Game brand would be retained by the franchisee, trading alongside the Electronics Boutique name.

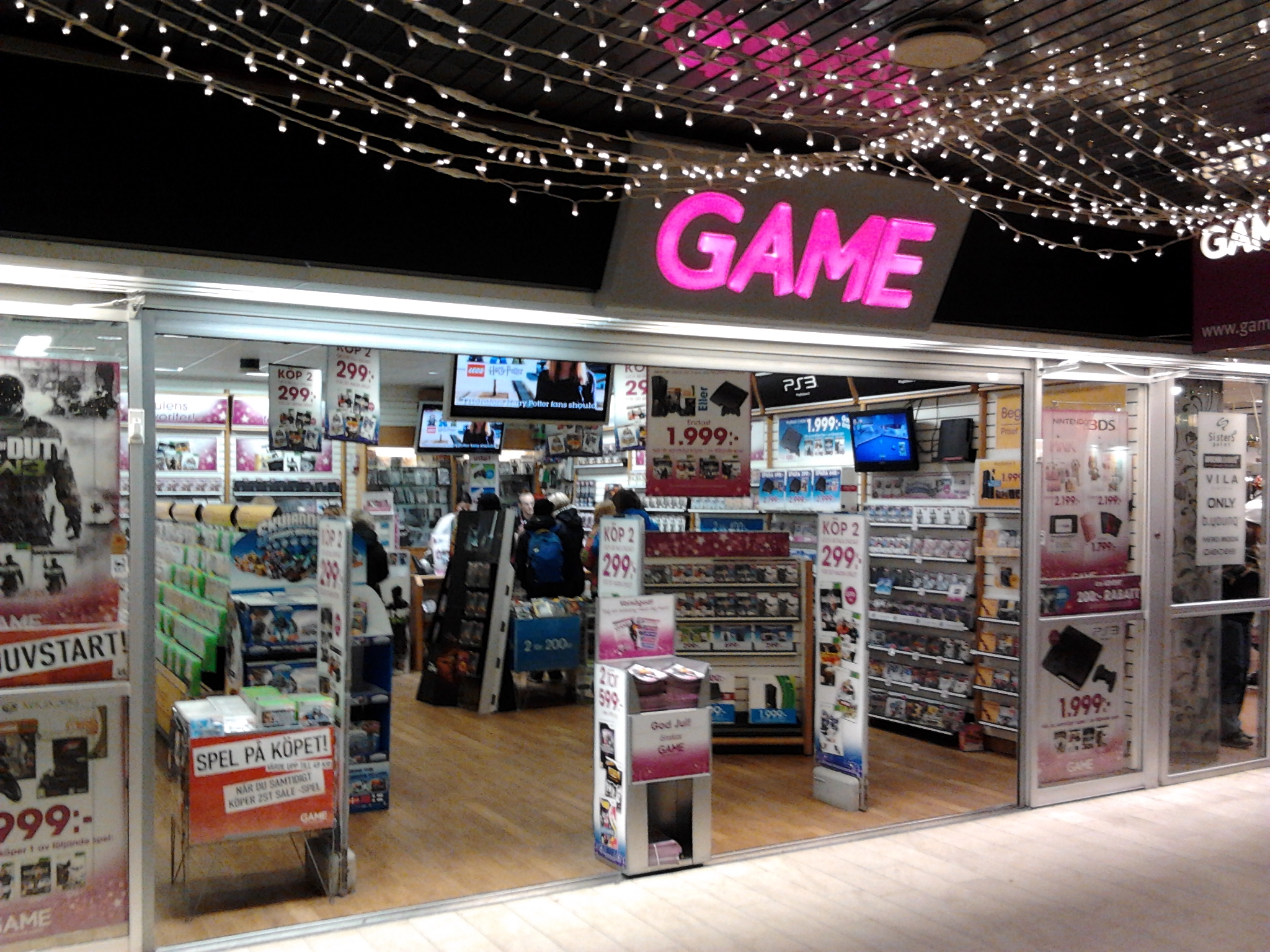
An example of a Game outlet in Umeå, Sweden

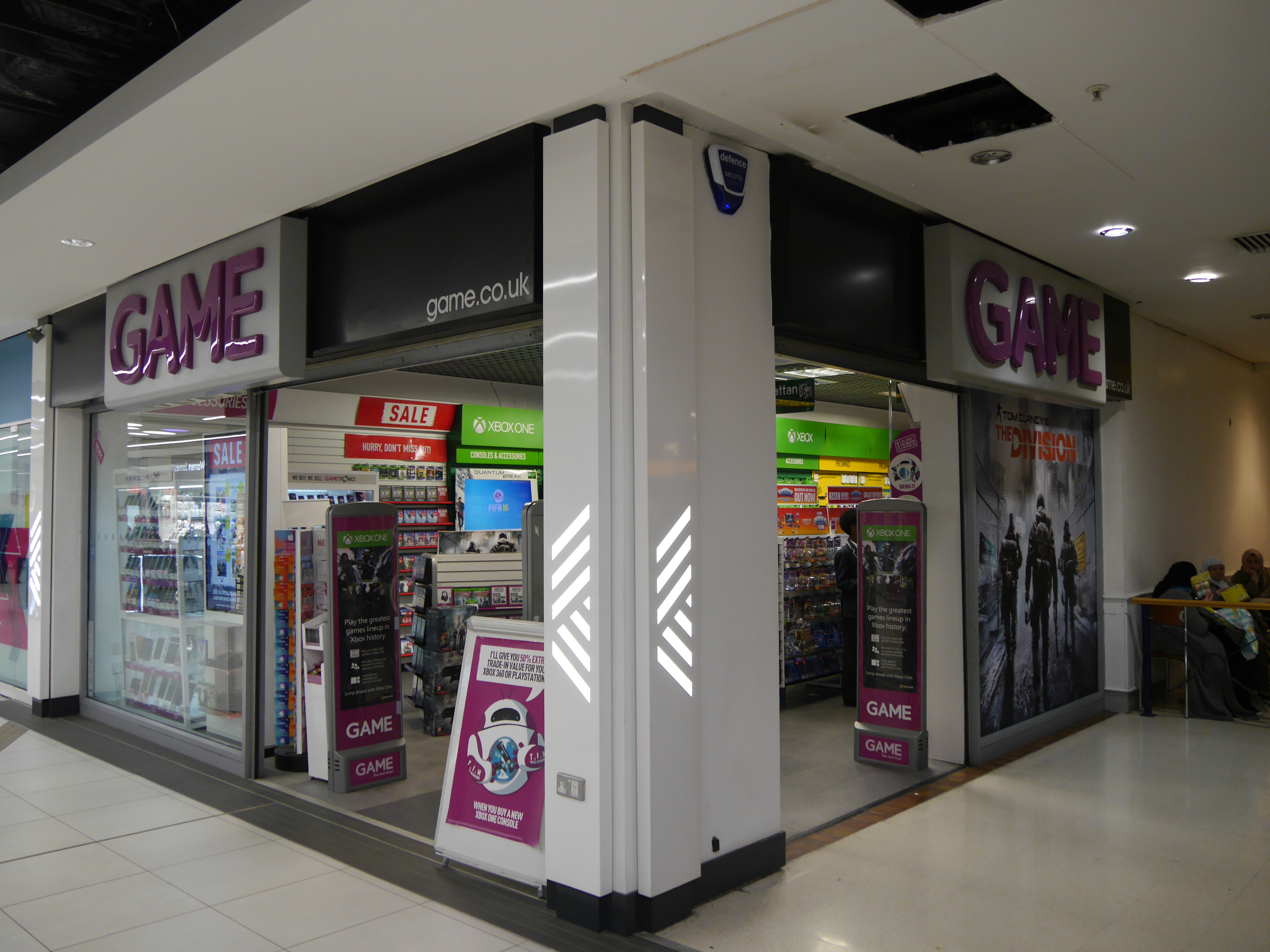
The exterior of a Game outlet, pictured in Kings Mall, Hammersmith (2016)

In April 2002, as the franchisee moved away from Electronics Boutique, all of its stores in the United Kingdom and Ireland would be rebranded as Game, and the parent company name was changed to The Game Group. Despite the name change, a 1% sales royalty to Electronics Boutique in the United States continued to be paid until January 2006. Attempts to have this overturned in court in February 2003 were unsuccessful.

In July 2004, the Game group acquired Gameplay (GB) Limited, an online and mail order retailer of video games, computer software and associated products. Gameplay (GB) Ltd started trading as Game.co.uk, the group's main online arm in the United Kingdom.

In September 2006, Game acquired Australian speciality video games retailer Gameswizards for A$3.8 million and rebranded all Gameswizards outlets as Game stores.

In May 2007, the company announced the acquisition of rival specialist video game chain Gamestation for £74 million. The company stated that they intended to retain the brand. On 21 April 2010, Lisa Morgan stepped down as CEO, to be replaced by Chris Bell as interim CEO. On 17 June 2010, it was announced that Ian Shepherd had been appointed as CEO, and took up the position on 28 June.

=== Financial problems ===
On 29 February 2012, it was announced that both Game and Gamestation would no longer stock new titles from Electronic Arts. This was due to the major games distributor limiting Game's credit terms. This affected the pre-orders of Mass Effect 3, due out the following week. On 5 March 2012, it was announced that Game and Gamestation stores would not be stocking titles by Capcom. The first title affected by the move was Street Fighter X Tekken. Customers who pre-ordered the special edition from either store were refunded. Other suppliers, including publishers Nintendo and Capcom, also refused to supply their latest products due to concerns over Game's creditworthiness.

In early March 2012, Game and Gamestation began heavily discounting stock in an attempt to bring in cash ahead of administration.

On 14 March 2012, OpCapita made an unsuccessful bid for the company. The business had been in talks with Game's lenders with the aim of buying its debt and settling its bills with suppliers in full. The offer was rejected by Game's lenders. Microsoft and Activision ceased the supply of their products to Game on 15 March. On 19 March, the company's shares were suspended from the London Stock Exchange at its own request.

=== OpCapita rescue ===
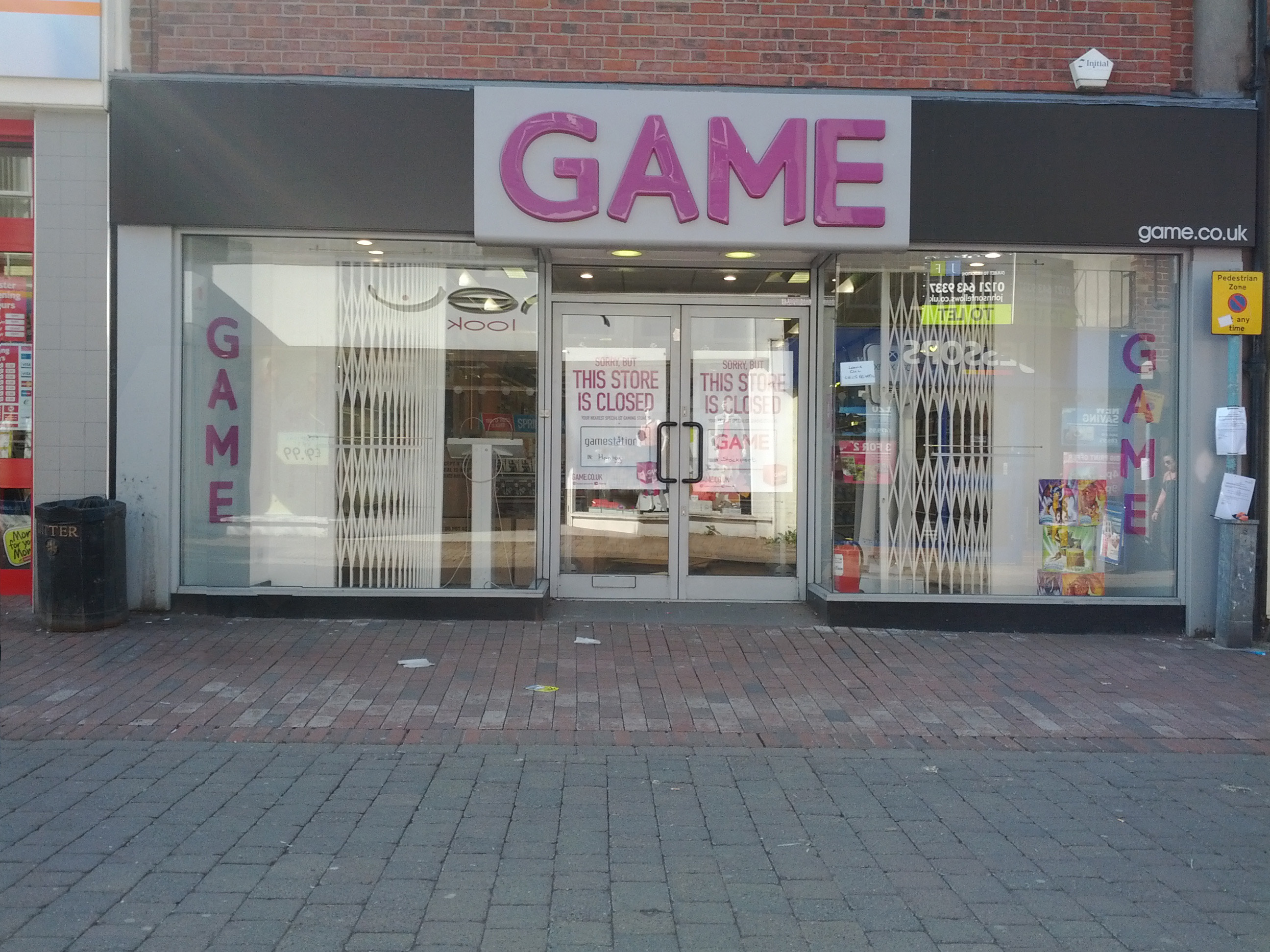
An example of a Game outlet that was victim to the 2012 administration, pictured in Macclesfield, Cheshire

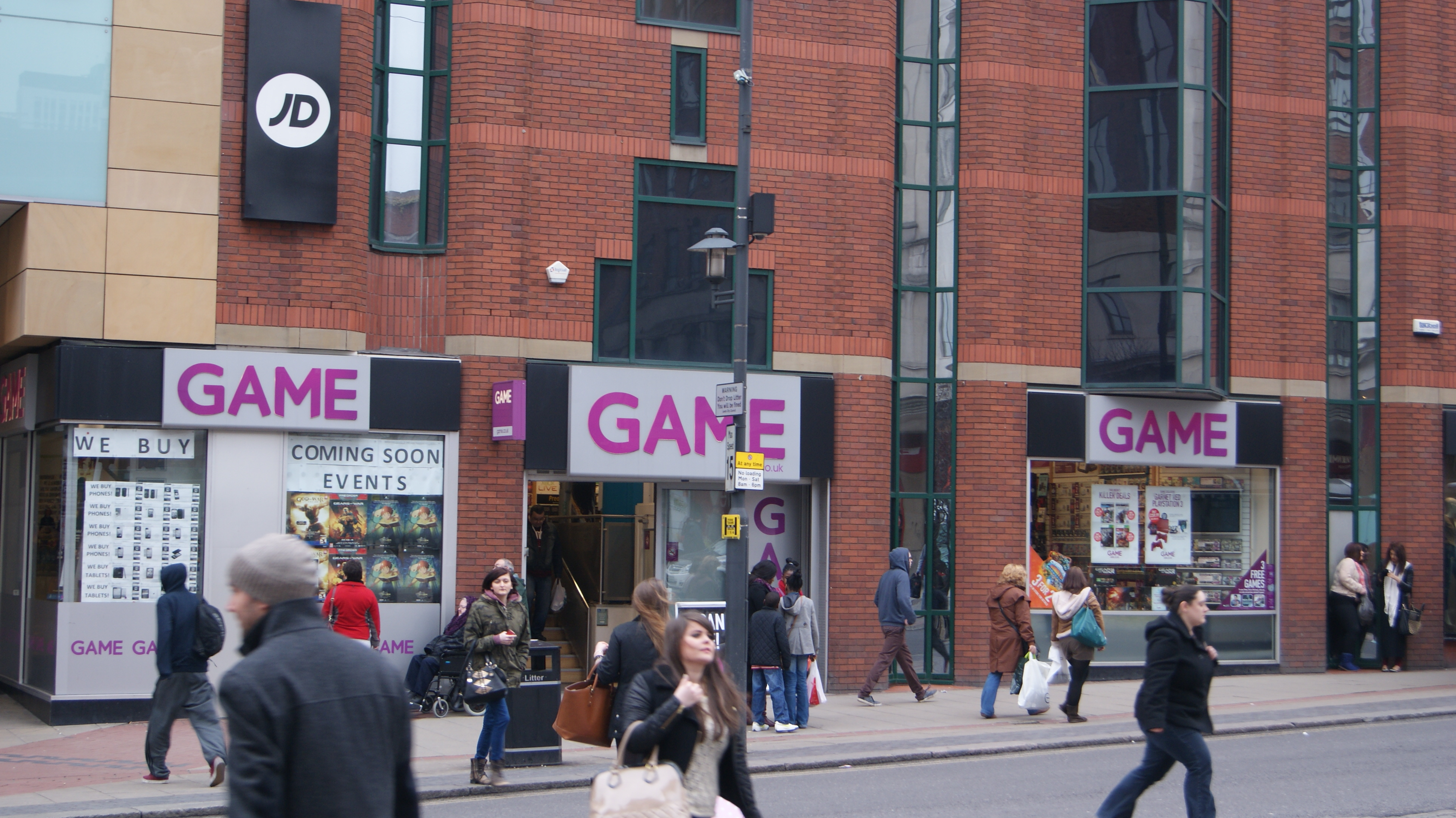
An example of a Game outlet, pictured in 2013. This location has since closed, and a Game concession has opened in a nearby Sports Direct location.

The company entered administration on 26 March 2012, with PricewaterhouseCoopers appointed and Ian Shepherd stepping down as CEO. No administrator was appointed for the stores in Ireland and redundancies were only offered to staff in the United Kingdom, resulting in a continuing protest from Irish staff. 277 of Game's 609 stores in the United Kingdom were closed immediately, resulting in 2,104 job losses.

On 31 March 2012, Game Group was purchased out of administration by OpCapita. David Hamid was announced as the new executive chairman of Game.

On 14 May 2012, TGW Pty Ltd, trading as Game Australia announced it would also enter administration. On 25 May 2012, Pricewaterhouse Coopers, the administrators of Game Australia made 264 staff redundant and closed 60 stores. An expected further round of redundancies and closures was confirmed on 19 June 2012 when the administrators announced that 16 of the remaining 31 stores would close that day and the remaining 15 would close over the coming weeks, marking the end of Game Australia.

Stores traded under the Game and Gamestation brands until the latter was replaced by Game from November 2012.

Game's Scandinavian operations were purchased by Nordic Games (parent company of Nordic Games Publishing AB) at the end of May 2012. Nordic Games purchased 55 stores (44 in Sweden and 11 in Norway) and Game's Scandinavian website from the retailer. Nordic and Game agreed a licensing deal that allowed the continued use of the Game brand within Sweden and Norway. In May 2015 the Swedish subsidiary went into administration. During this time Nordic decided to reshuffle the company with no effect as the Swedish subsidiary of the company went into liquidation by June 2015, as a result of this Nordic had to sell all of their stock as soon as possible at half the retail price they were originally listed as. All Swedish and Norwegian locations shut down in the summer of 2015.

In May 2014, the company announced plans to relist on the London Stock Exchange. The initial public offering took place in June 2014.

=== Frasers Group purchase ===
In June 2019, OpCapita agreed to a takeover of Game by Frasers Group for £52 million. Game had 540 stores in the UK and Spain when the takeover was completed.

Game has re-entered the Irish market as of December 2023, inside of a Sports Direct in Roscommon.

In January 2024, the retailer announced it would phase out trade-ins and pre-owned games by February.

In June 2024, the retailer announced it would be ending its reward point scheme by the following month.

In March 2025, Game Stores Iberia, consisting of Spanish operations of 220 stores, was sold by Frasers Group to GuideBridge Capital; the stores continue to trade as Game.

In April 2025, Game's Basingstoke Head Office closed down, further highlighting the demise of the standalone business, with more integration going towards the Sports Direct and House of Fraser concessions.

In January 2026, Frasers Group reported they were intending to place Game Retail Limited into administration. It was later announced that the three remaining UK standalone Game stores in Dudley, Lancaster and Sutton were due to close in April 2026, whilst the Sports Direct, Frasers and Lilywhites concessions will continue, alongside the online business. Managing director Nick Arran would also be stepping down. In February 2026, Game.co.uk's operator was changed from Game Retail Limited to Frasers Group Trading Limited, trading as Sports Direct.

In February 2026, Game Spain announced that they would be opening more stores and refurbishing existing ones, taking a different route than Game UK's demise.

== Other projects ==
=== Insomnia Gaming Festival ===
Insomnia Gaming Festival was a large-scale gaming event ran by Game sub-brand Player1 Events, with a professional Main Stage, an Expo Hall and a large-scale LAN (Local Area Network) event which is the largest LAN in the UK. Originally this was a PC gaming only event, but in recent years has incorporated console gamers. The series of events, referred to as the ‘iSeries’ are sequentially numbered and run three times a year, typically with one around Easter, with the others usually hosted in August and November. The original events were hosted at Newbury Racecourse in the United Kingdom from i5 to i33 when the venue was relocated to Stoneleigh Park for i34. From i38 to i42 the event returned to Newbury. The home of i43 to i50 events was The Telford International Centre and from i51 to i55 it took place at the Ricoh Arena in Coventry. i56 - present day is being held at the NEC in Birmingham due to its growth and popularity. These events have evolved with professional competitive tournaments and large exhibition halls. Popular segments of the festival include main stage shows by special guests, often YouTube personalities, as well as evening entertainment such as the "World Famous Insomnia Pub Quiz". Sometimes referred to as "The Glastonbury of Gaming", Insomnia continues to be the biggest festival of its kind in the UK. The first Insomnia: Insomnia99 was a 300-player event. At that point, it was, and remains, the largest LAN party held in the United Kingdom. It was announced during i55 that the festival would relocate to the NEC in Birmingham in time for i56 in December 2015.

=== Christmas Shopper Simulator ===
A promotional freeware video game titled Christmas Shopper Simulator was published by Game in 2014 and developed by Freak Storm Games using the game engine Unity, and it received a sequel the next year titled Christmas Shopper 2: Black Friday.

== See also ==
- EB Games
- Gamestation
- Gameswizards
