= EB Games =

American video game retailer

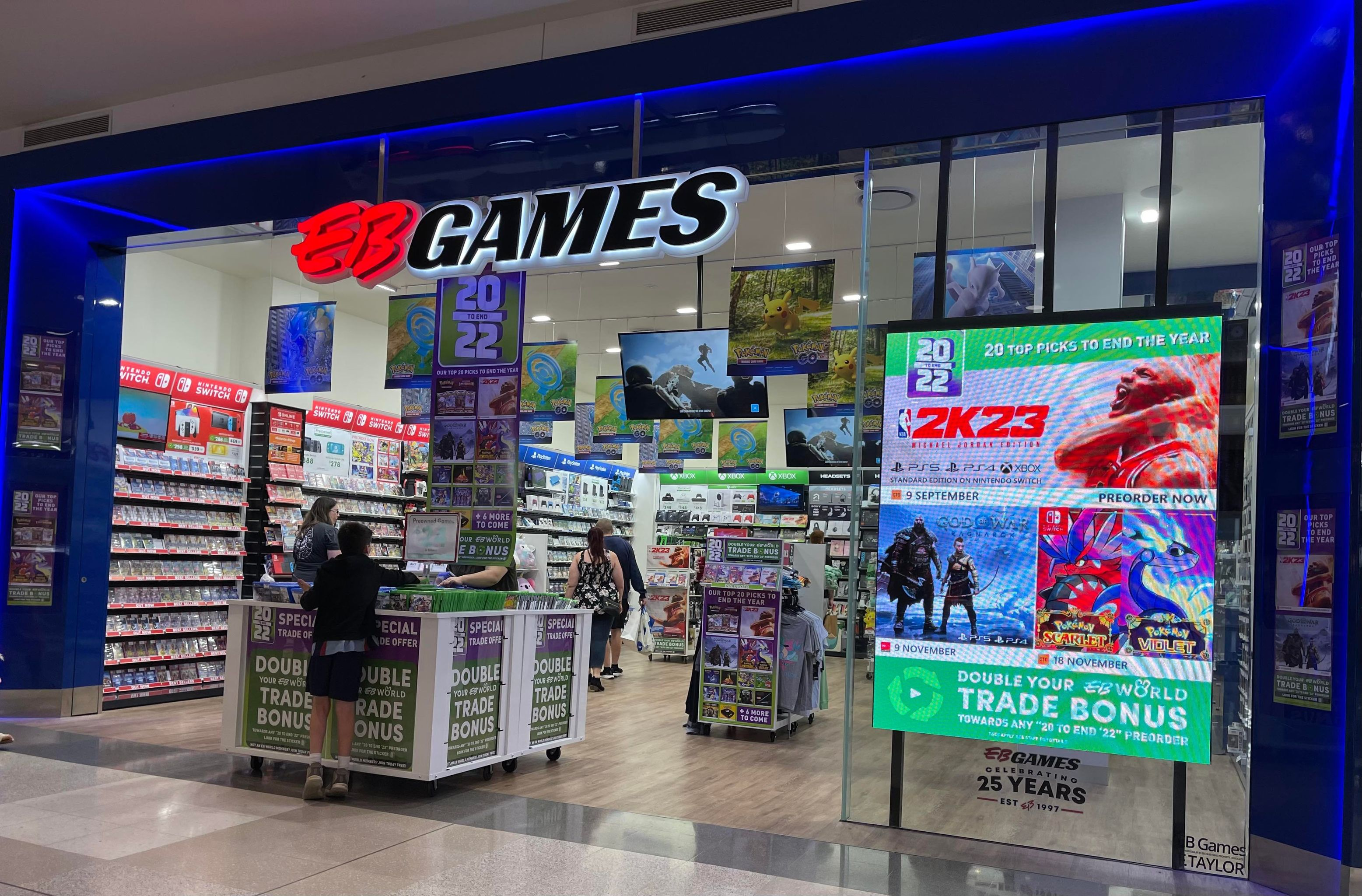
- An EB Games Store located in Westfield Chermside in Brisbane Australia
- Formerly: Electronics Boutique, EBX, EB World
- Industry: Retail
- Founded: 1977; 49 years ago (as Electronics Boutique); Philadelphia, U.S.
- Area served: Australia; Canada Former locations: Austria; Denmark; Finland; France; Germany; Ireland; Italy; New Zealand; Norway; Puerto Rico; Spain; South Korea; Sweden; United Kingdom; United States
- Products: Video games Video game merchandise
- Owner: GameStop Corp. (Australia); Stephan Tetrault (Canada)

EB Games (previously known as Electronics Boutique) is an American video game retail chain brand founded in 1977 by James Kim in Philadelphia. Electronics Boutique sold calculators, radios and digital watches before pivoting towards sales of computers and software products. In the mid-1990s, Electronics Boutique became a video game retailer, later expanding internationally across Canada, Europe and Australia. In 2002, it was renamed EB Games, with some stores also trading as EBX and EB World. As of July 2026, it has active operations in Australia and Canada.

In October 2005, EB Games accepted a takeover deal from rival GameStop Corp. for $1.44 billion, who phased out the EB name in the United States, renaming all American outlets to GameStop. The EB name still survives in Australia and Canada due to local brand recognition, with the name used under franchise agreements from GameStop Corp.

== History ==
Originally, the operation mainly sold calculators and digital watches. Between 1977 and the mid-1990s, the company expanded to (and later stopped) selling computers, software, and other related items (according to the EB Games employee handbook). Electronics Boutique also operated stores under the name Games 'n Gadgets. The Games 'n Gadgets stores were more centered on entertainment and gaming, rather than business and productivity. In the mid-1990s, the company's focus switched to TV-based video games and consoles, though many stores still maintain PC game sections.

On April 3, 2000, Electronics Boutique made an offer to purchase rival business FuncoLand for $110 million, paying $17.50 in cash for each of parent company Funco's shares. CEO Joseph Firestone remarked that his company had been "stalking" FuncoLand for two years, and waited until the stock price was right. On April 5, Funco received an unsolicited $135 million buyout offer from Barnes & Noble subsidiary Babbage's Etc., who offered to pay in either cash or a combination of cash and Barnes & Noble stock. On April 12, Funco gave Electronics Boutique five days to raise its offer before they would accept Barnes & Noble's offer. In response, Electronics Boutique matched Barnes & Noble's offer. On April 26, Barnes & Noble raised its bid to $161.5 million, or $24.75 a share, leaving Electronics Boutique with another five days to respond to the bid. On May 3, Electronics Boutique announced the withdrawal of its bid, and Funco accepted Barnes & Noble's buyout the following day. Electronic Boutique's original definitive agreement with Funco included a breakup fee of $3.5 million, the cost of which was covered by Barnes & Noble.

In May 2002, in order to unify their company, Electronics Boutique changed the vast majority of its current EB and EB Gameworld stores to the name EB Games. They also announced that they would be either closing or selling all of their EB Kids and Brandywine Sports Collectible Stores.

For years EB Games' primary distribution center was in Louisville, Kentucky, with two smaller distribution centers and a World Headquarters all located in West Chester, Pennsylvania. With video games becoming increasingly popular, EB Games decided it was time for a new distribution center. In October 2004, EB Games opened its doors to its new 314,000-square-foot (29,200 m^{2}) distribution center in Sadsbury Township, Pennsylvania. The world headquarter office in West Chester remained open, however anyone working at the old distribution centers were transferred to the new location.

On October 6, 2005, shareholders from EB Games and GameStop agreed to a $1.44 billion takeover deal. The deal offered $38.15 in cash as well as approximately ¾ of a share of GameStop stock for every share of EB Games stock. This offer was a 34.2% premium on the $41.12 per share closing price of EB Games stock. GameStop decided to close EB Games's newly constructed distribution center in Sadsbury, Pennsylvania, their call center in Las Vegas, and their international headquarters in West Chester, Pennsylvania, eliminating more than 800 jobs. 65 former EB Games employees were offered jobs at GameStop's headquarters in Grapevine, Texas.

== List of operations ==
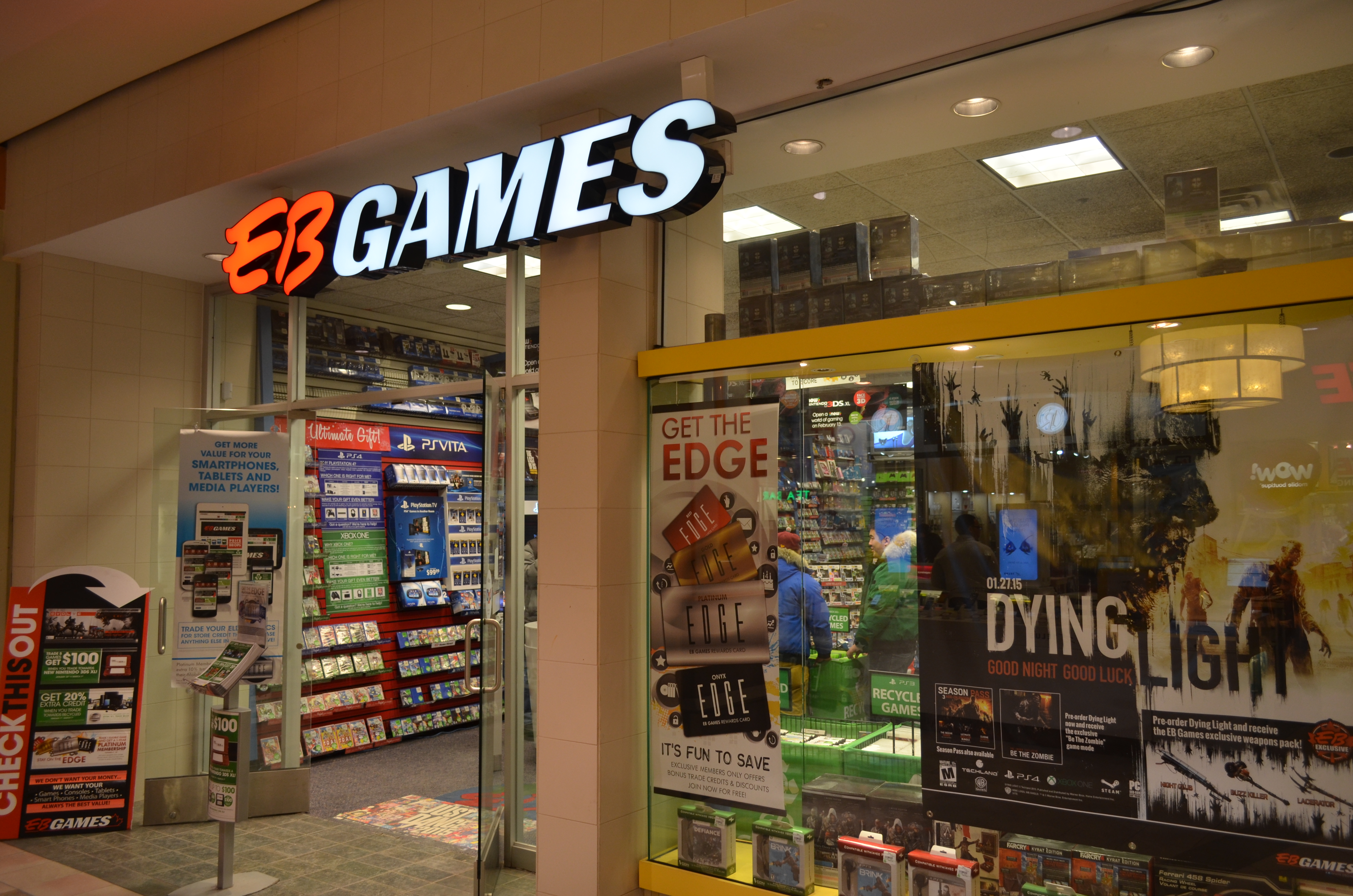
An EB Games store (later GameStop) at Hillcrest Mall in February 2015

=== Canada ===
EB began its international expansion with the opening of three stores in Toronto, Ontario, Canada in 1993. The Canadian division was the largest of the international divisions with over 300 stores as of May 2008.

On July 28, 2021, EB Games announced that its Canadian operations would be rebranded under the GameStop name, with the rebranding expected to be completed by the end of 2021. Stores began to be converted to GameStop signage by September 2021.

On May 5, 2025, GameStop Canada announced their assets had been sold to Canadian businessman Stephan Tétrault and the brand would be reverting to the EB Games name in the near future.

=== Australia ===
In 1997, Electronics Boutique entered the Australian market, opening its first store in the Westfield Miranda in New South Wales; eventually becoming the first national video games retailer in Australia.

Since 2007, EB Games Australia has maintained a charity partnership with the Starlight Children's Foundation. Every year, EB Games runs a "Starlight Week" fund-raising endeavours across EB Games and Zing Pop Culture stores. In 2021, Starlight Week raised over $850,000 for the Foundation.

In May 2011, EB Games announced the launch of the EB Games Expo, a video game trade fair / convention held annually in Australia. More commonly known as EB Expo or EBX, the inaugural convention was held at the Gold Coast Convention and Exhibition Centre from 15 to 16 October of the same year. The Expo is used by video game developers to show off their upcoming games and game-related hardware. Unlike E3 at the time, EB Expo allowed members of the general public to attend.

Logo for EB World

In October 2011, EB Games launched their EB World loyalty program. At launch, the program offered four reward levels, with customers able to progress through tiers by earning points called "carrots" when shopping at EB Games stores (and later included Zing Pop Culture stores).

In May 2015, four former EB Games employees accused an EB Games district manager of workplace bullying, sexual harassment, discrimination, racial hatred, intimidation, and unpaid worked hours. The incidents were alleged to have occurred in the Figtree and Dapto stores. The former employees filed complaints with WorkCover Authority of New South Wales and the Australian Human Rights Commission.

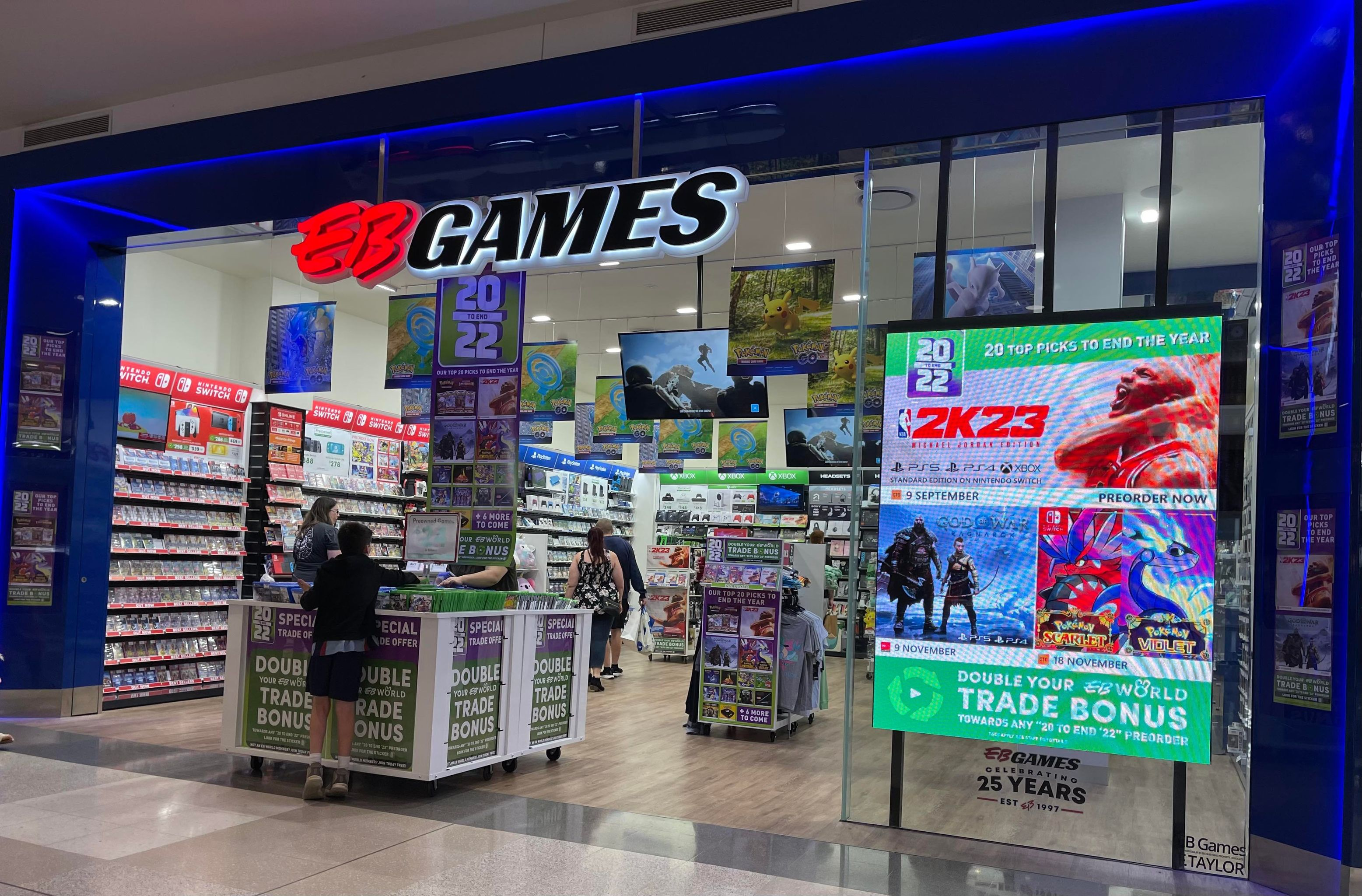
An EB Games outlet located in Westfield Chermside, Brisbane, Australia in 2022

In January 2020, EB Games reported it would close 19 unprofitable stores by the end of the month.

In February 2021, The Sydney Morning Herald published an article about EB Games, notifying its divergence into selling pop culture merchandise and selling pre-owned games had been critical to its success. In the same month, the EB Games reported commercial success, and that it would seek to open new stores.

==== Zing Pop Culture ====
In July 2014, EB Games Australia opened Zing Pop Culture (stylised as ZiNG Pop Culture) an Australian pop culture merchandise retailer. The first ZiNG Pop Culture store was located at the Indooroopilly Shopping Centre in Indooroopilly, Queensland.

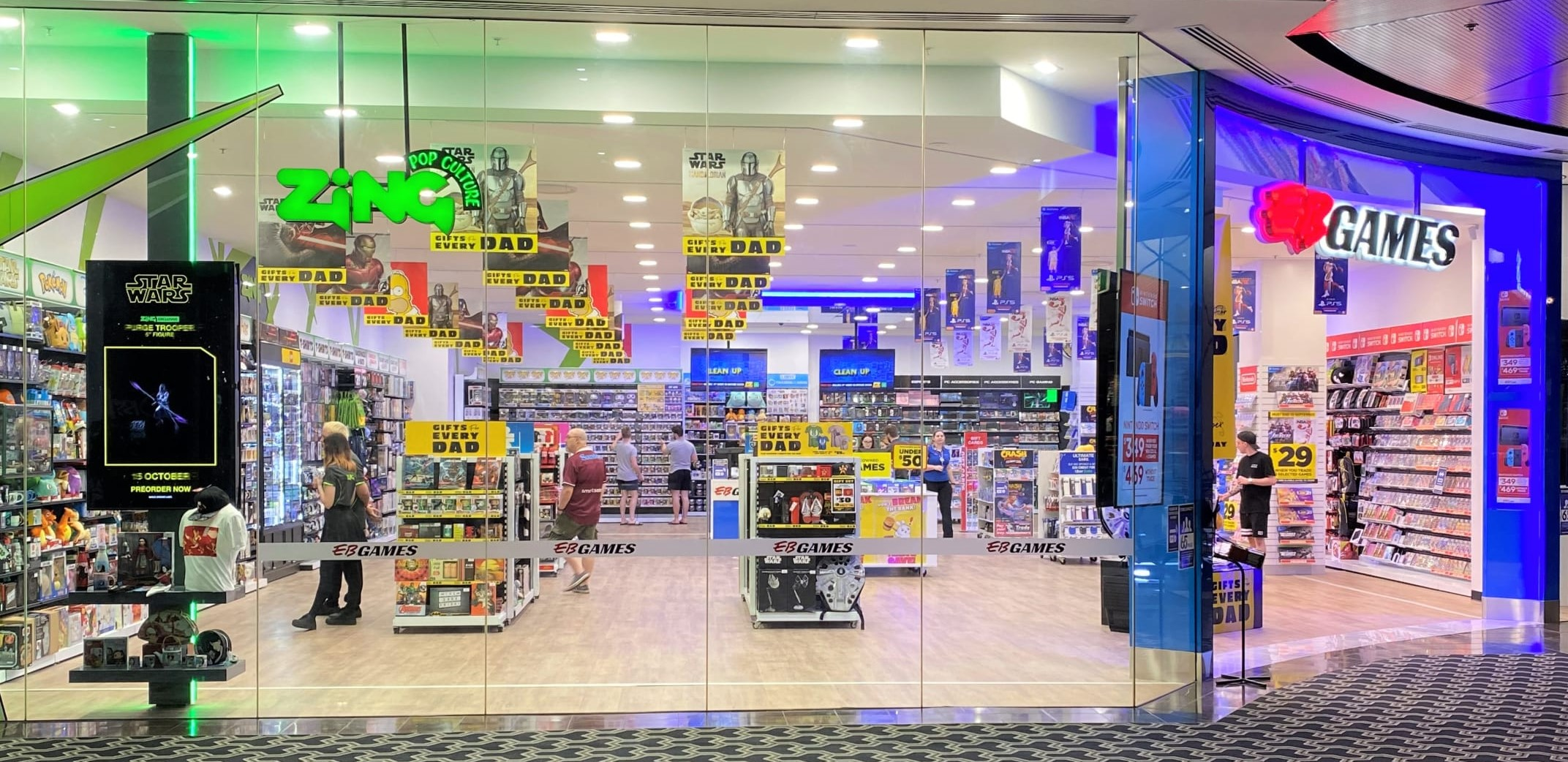
An EB Games and ZiNG Pop Culture 'Hybrid' store located in Westfield Carindale, Brisbane, Australia in 2020

EB Games launched a spin-off of Zing Pop Culture, called Zing Marketplace, in September 2021. Zing Marketplace was an Australian e-commerce retro gaming and pop culture marketplace which facilitated consumer-to-consumer sales through its website. Zing Marketplace was discontinued by EB Games on 22 March 2022.

As of January 2026, Zing operates 336 stores in Australia.

== List of defunct international operations ==
=== Europe ===
EB Games operated in Spain, Germany, France, Austria, Denmark, Finland, Italy, Norway and Sweden. On May 23, 2005, EB Games announced a definitive agreement to acquire the Spanish retailer Jump, based in Valencia. Jump sold PCs and other consumer electronics. EB Games planned to begin introducing video game hardware and software into Jump's 141 stores several months after the acquisition. The acquisition provided EB Games entry into the Spanish marketplace and continued EB Games' aggressive international expansion.

All of the EB Games stores in Mainland Europe were later either rebranded to GameStop, or divested of.

=== New Zealand ===
In 2000, Electronics Boutique entered New Zealand, opening its first store in Auckland. In 2008, GameStop announced it had acquired The Gamesman (not to be confused with the Australian retailer The Gamesmen) which was at the time New Zealand's largest independent gaming specialist with eight stores. The acquisition added eight stores and expanded EB Games' presence in New Zealand to a total of 38 stores, bringing the total store count to 308 in Australia and New Zealand.

In mid-January 2026, EB Games announced it would end all operations in New Zealand by the 31st, citing a multi-million dollar loss in the 2024 financial year and beyond, likely caused by the decline of physical game sales in the country. The company confirmed plans to allow New Zealand customers to shop online directly from EB Games Australia from March onward. In late May 2026, Radio New Zealand reported that the closure of EB Games's New Zealand operations had cost the company a full-year loss of $11.5 million. In addition, the company had paid NZ$801,000 in employee severance costs and NZ$609,000 for accrued leave owed to staff.

=== Puerto Rico ===
By 2001, EB Games had opened stores in Puerto Rico. These stores were later rebranded as GameStop, and closed in 2016.

=== South Korea ===
Electronics Boutique formerly had a presence in South Korea.

=== United Kingdom and Ireland ===
In October 1995, Electronics Boutique expanded into the UK by purchasing a 25% stake in the financially troubled British game retailer, The Rhino Group, becoming Electronics Boutique Limited. The chain's trading name was changed from Future Zone to Electronics Boutique to reflect the new ownership. John Steinbrecher, Electronics Boutique's VP of Stores in the US and Canada, was seconded to the UK to manage the chain. Through store remodels, adjustments to the product mix, and the introduction of used video games, the chain's finances were successfully restored.

In November 1999, Electronics Boutique Limited purchased rival retailer Game for £99 million. Game had 86 stores at the time of the takeover, and the Game brand would be retained, trading alongside the Electronics Boutique name.

In October 2001, Electronics Boutique Limited went on to purchase the BarrysWorld online gaming service, the French retailer ScoreGames, and the Spanish retailer Centro Mail.

In 2002, Electronics Boutique Limited became The Game Group, with the Game brand replacing the Electronics Boutique name at all stores in the United Kingdom and Ireland, making the new company the largest video game retailer in the UK. Electronics Boutique USA retained a 24% ownership stake in The Game Group for a period and, under the merger agreement, collected substantial management fees until 2004. That year, The Game Group and Electronics Boutique USA agreed to sever the remainder of their ties through a one-time settlement.

== See also ==
- EB Games Expo
