= Keddies =

Former British department store chain

G.J.Keddie & Sons Limited
- Type: Private company
- Industry: Retail
- Genre: Department store
- Founded: 1892
- Defunct: 1996
- Fate: Administration
- Headquarters: Southend-on-Sea
- Key people: Murray David Maitland Keddie

Keddies was a small chain of department stores in Essex, England, with its flagship store in a prime location in Southend High Street (originally called the Broadway). The business had a national reputation, being recognised in The Fashion Handbook, appearing on the side of a Matchbox model 17C bus and being one of the retailers that fought to remove Retail Price Maintenance. The business grew in the 1970s opening further branches across Essex, before closing them during the 1980s. Keddies closed for business on 26 February 1996 after going into administration.

== Early years ==
George James Keddie was born in Hintlesham in Suffolk in March 1855. At 16 he moved to Auchtermuchty in Scotland to work as an apprentice at his Uncle, John Keddie's drapery store, but in 1879 he returned to Suffolk and married Laura Fletcher. By 1881, Keddie was working as a draper in Braintree in Essex, however in 1892 he opened a Drapery at 144-146 High Street, Southend. The store expanded by buying neighbouring stores and become a full department store, selling everything from penny lines to more extravagant goods. In the middle of 1906, The Record published pictures of what it considered to be the best British window displays and Keddies was regularly featured. This included a mechanical window display designed by Arthur Maitland Keddie which was observed in US publication Style in 1908. Arthur Maitland Keddie went onto win several prizes for his window dressings including the journal The Review's first prize for the best decked and most original show window in the world and wrote the 1912 book Window Dressing for Beginners, which was seen as a manual by the drapery trade. During the First World War, Arthur Maitland Keddie organised day trips for wounded soldiers from the Queen Mary Naval Hospital to Thundersley and Runwell.

In 1921, George James Keddie died aged 65, leaving the business to his three sons, Arthur Maitland Fletcher Keddie, Frederick Wallace Keddie and George Douglas Fletcher Keddie. The business was grown by the brothers, opening drapery stores in London Road, Hadleigh (on the corner with Rectory Road closed 1946/47); Market Hill, Coggeshall (Sold 1928) and on The Broadway, Leigh-on-Sea (on the corner with Oakleigh Park Drive). The business boomed during the 1920s even though there was competition from J F Dixons, Brightwells and Thomas Brothers. With this success the main store was completely rebuilt and expanded in 1934, with an impressive frontage that aped the main Selfridges store in Oxford Street, London. People would take the train from the east-end of London to shop at Keddies. In 1948, Keddies became one of the founding members of the Associated Independent Stores buying group.

== Expansion ==
Keddies continued to grow under David and Peter Keddie, and in 1960 they bought a disused cinema, the Essoldo, that was located behind their store and opened Southend's first supermarket, which was also one of the first discounters in the UK, Supa-Save. The new store had 15 aisles and 15,000 Square foot, and in the first Saturday of its doors opening, they had to be closed after just a quarter of an hour due to the size of the crowd. Through Supa-Save, Keddies challenged the retail status quo, challenging the Retail Price Maintenance, or RPM (fixed supplier pricing, see Resale price maintenance set by manufacturers. David & Peter Keddie told the Daily Herald in 1960, "We would sooner make a 1,000 pennies than 100 sixpences", and that they would tell the manufacturers, "We will tell them what they can do with the price maintenance. Manufacturers have no right to dictate retail prices as long as they get the price they ask". Their actions were instrumental in eventually abolishing the Retail Price Maintenance against legal and regulatory opposition. Following a number of injunctions, court cases, and joining forces with other retailers, the RPM was eventually abolished in 1964.

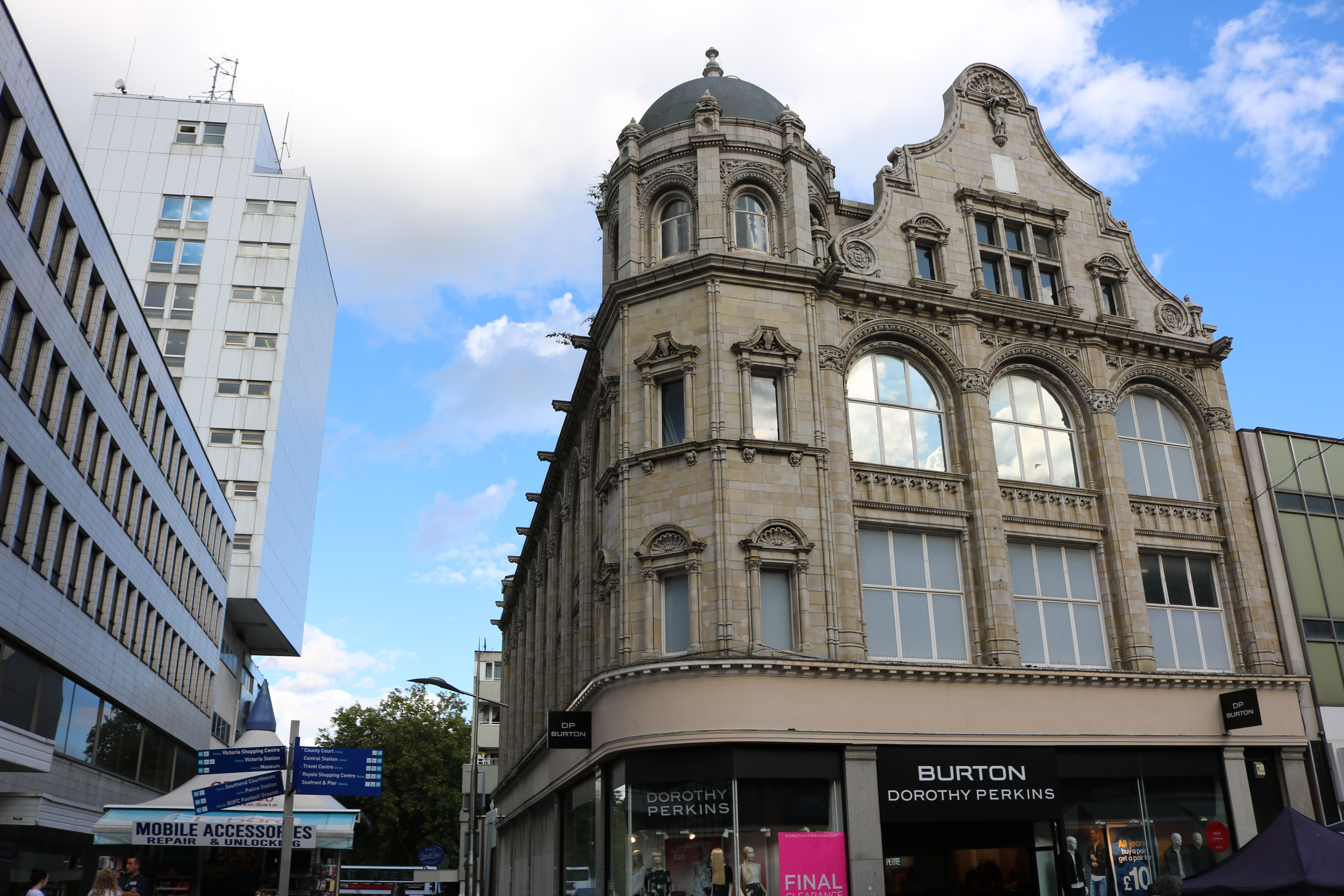
Maitland House on the rear left

In addition to Supa-Save, a large extension of 35,000 square feet was added to the rear of the original store, which was connected to the original store by a bridge over, and a tunnel under Leather Lane. The development was completed by Norwich Union included an office block called Maitland House (after the Keddie's family name), and a parking lot which was all designed by the modernist architects Yorke Rosenberg Mardall, in what was the first building to feature their ubiquitous white tile styling. The cost of the project was £600,000. The car parking system, using a lift and trollies was seen not to have much of a future by the Architects' Journal in 1965. Photos of the iconic store interior in 1963 are on the RIBA picture website, and along with Cole Brothers in Sheffield, were seen as the pioneers in using Brutialism in retail architecture by RIBA. An article on the design of the building appeared in the October–December 1963 edition of Concrete Monthly, the magazine from the Cement and Concrete Association. The development received a Civic Trust Award in 1963. Maitland House was the home of KeyMed Medical & Industrial Equipment in 1969, and between 1972 and 1996 it was home to the Access credit card company. In the late 1960s, a new store was opened in Queen Street, Colchester.

In 1970 Supa-Save was closed because of competition from chain supermarkets entering Southend. The old building was demolished and the department store extended over the site in 1971, again designed by Yorke Rosenberg Mardall. Yorke Rosenberg Mardall were again employed when the store was planned to be extended on the site of the old National Provincial Bank in 1973. The development included getting permission to close Leather Lane which divided the new and old building, which permission was received in 1975 and was constructed by Bovis Construction for £150,000. The extension had a new banking hall for National Westminster Bank being located on the first floor and accessed by escalators. The original store frontage was covered over with white slats to try and visually tie the old building into the new tiled building, with only a few of the columns left exposed and painted blue. In the 1980s, Keddies took Norwich Union to court regarding issues with the floors in the new buildings.

The business further grew in the 1970s opening branches in Romford, after purchasing the site from the Hammerson group, and Stratford High Street (former Boardmans store). Most of these had closed by the late 1980s, with the Stratford store closing in 1984 before being demolished and making way for Boardman House, and the Colchester store closing in 1996. The Colchester store was on two sides of Queen Street, with one side now being replaced by Priory Walk, while the eastern side stood until partial demolition in 2017, with the remaining building being converted into a Curzon cinema.

The store's owner, David Keddie formed, and became chairman of, Essex Radio in 1981. This later became Essex FM and then Heart Essex. Under his full name, Murray David Maitland Keddie, he became High Sheriff of Essex in 1986.

== Modernisation and administration ==
In the 1980s the Southend store was modernised and refitted in anticipation of more business coming to Southend with the opening of the Royals Shopping Centre. The modernisation attracted chain stores HMV, Tie Rack, Olympus Sports, Dillons the Bookstore and Cramphorn Garden Centres to open departments. The company in 1992 made a profit of £263,813 on a turnover of £15,536,602, however, this new found optimism did not last and the company went into administration. On 26 February 1996 after 104 years of trading the store was closed.

== Building today ==
The building was bought by developers, who wanted to rebuild behind the 1930s High Street fascia; however they found that frontage had been badly damaged by the addition of the slats in the 60s. Instead the developers built a fibreglass copy which still sits in the High Street. However, since the rebuilding there have been many tenants, with Tesco, JJB Sports, GAP, Clintons, Republic, Superdrug, Sports Direct, USC and HMV all holding tenancy on the High Street side.

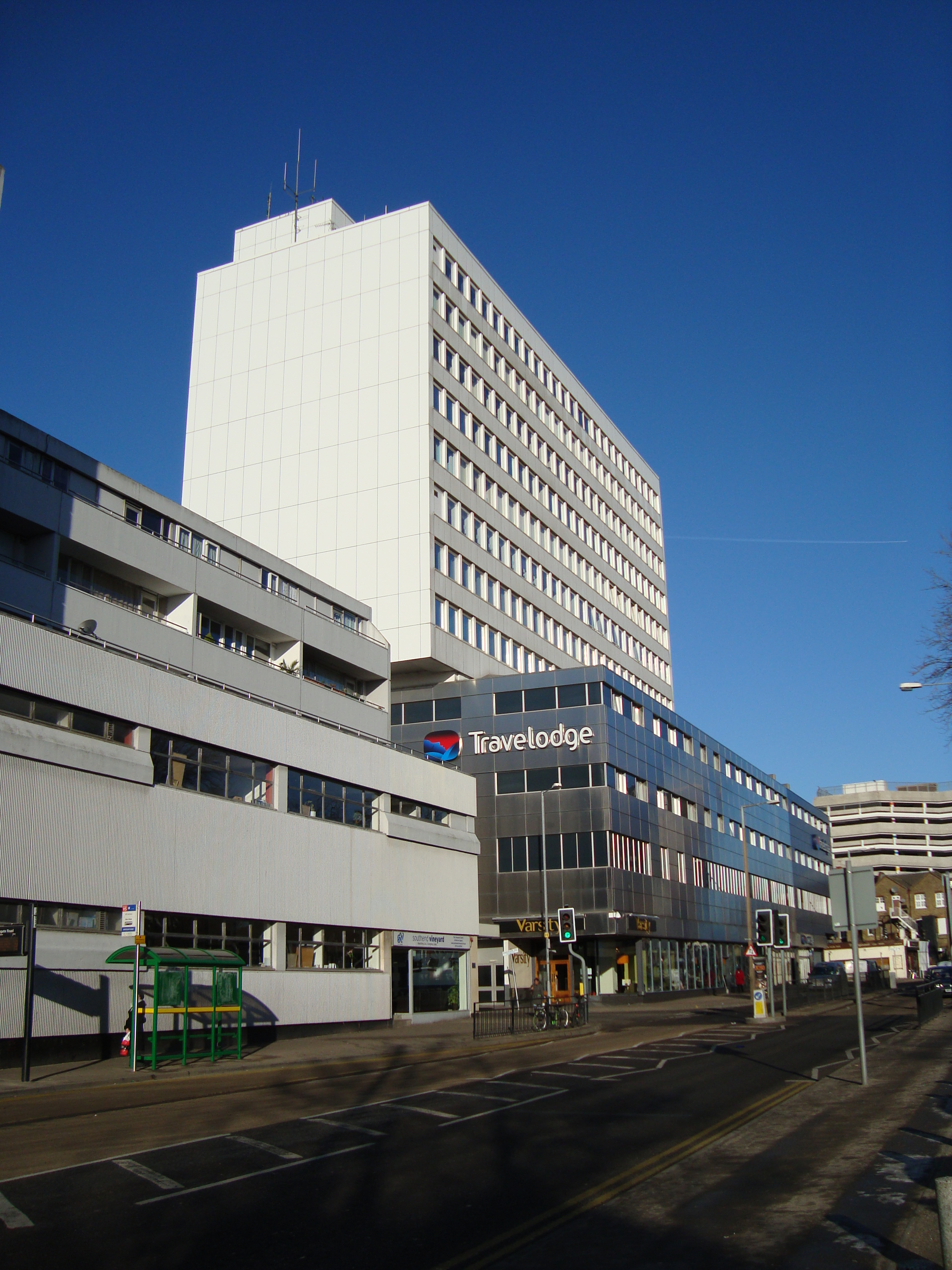
Former Keddies store facing Warrior Square

The rear of the building facing Warrior Square was empty until the early 2000s when it was converted into a Travelodge, bar and restaurant and a nightclub. Maitland House was the former home to InsureandGo and also houses the transmitters for Heart Essex and BBC Essex. It is currently home to call centre service provider Ventrica. In March 2023, it was announced that the space above the former store was put up for sale. The space has planning permission to build 100 homes in an eleven-story extension to Maitland House.
