= Murray David Maitland Keddie =

Murray David Maitland Keddie (27 May 1929 – 18 February 2018), FRSA known as David Keddie, was a prominent Essex businessman, broadcaster, benefactor, magistrate, Deputy Lieutenant and High Sheriff of Essex in 1986.

== Early life ==
Keddie was educated at Summer Fields School, Summertown, Oxford, and Malvern College (at that time housed with Harrow School, as Malvern College was requisitioned by TRE for World War II effort). In the period 1947-51, whilst studying for the Bar, he served in the Inns of Court Regiment, part of the Territorial Force, and then served as a National Service Officer in the 10th Field Regiment, Royal Artillery until 1953.

== Business life ==
In 1954, he joined Keddies, the family-owned department store in Southend-on-Sea, Essex, as a Director. He managed Keddies for 42 years until it ceased trading in 1996, due to the effect of competition from out-of-town centre shopping malls. During his time in charge he expanded Keddies into a small department store chain during the 60s and 70s.

Whilst at Keddies, in the early 1960s, he pioneered Supa-Save discount stores in Southend. With these he challenged the retail status quo and was instrumental in eventually abolishing the Retail Price Maintenance, or RPM (fixed supplier pricing, see Resale price maintenance), against legal and regulatory opposition. Following a number of injunctions, court cases, and joining forces with other retailers, the RPM was eventually abolished in 1964.

== Public offices ==
Keddie held a number of public offices over the years. In 1972, he was Senior Magistrate for the Southend Bench; in 1983, he was Deputy Lieutenant of Essex and, in 1985-86 he was appointed High Sheriff of Essex (the first holder of the title to come from South Essex). In 1986 he was President of the Essex Show, and continued as Director of the Essex Agricultural Society.

== Broadcasting ==
In 1981, after unsuccessfully lobbying the BBC to launch a local radio station in Essex, he founded Essex Radio (renamed Heart Essex (Chelmsford & Southend)), and was its first Chairman until 1991

== Architecture ==
He was a proponent of the Modern Movement in Essex, commissioning architects Yorke, Rosenberg & Mardall to design the family home, Ark House (1962) and redevelop the Keddies store in Southend (1960–64). The Keddies store was awarded a Civic Trust Award in 1963 and featured in Concrete Quarterly (1963)

== Public and charitable work ==
He was also active in charitable, fundraising activities:

- 1970–1990 Chairman of the Industrial Consultative Council
- 1979–1990 Chairman of the Palace Theatre Trust
- 1998–2001 Director, Southend Hospital Charity Foundation

== See also ==
- Keddies
- High Sheriff of Essex#1974–1999
