= DW Sports Fitness =

British retailing and fitness business

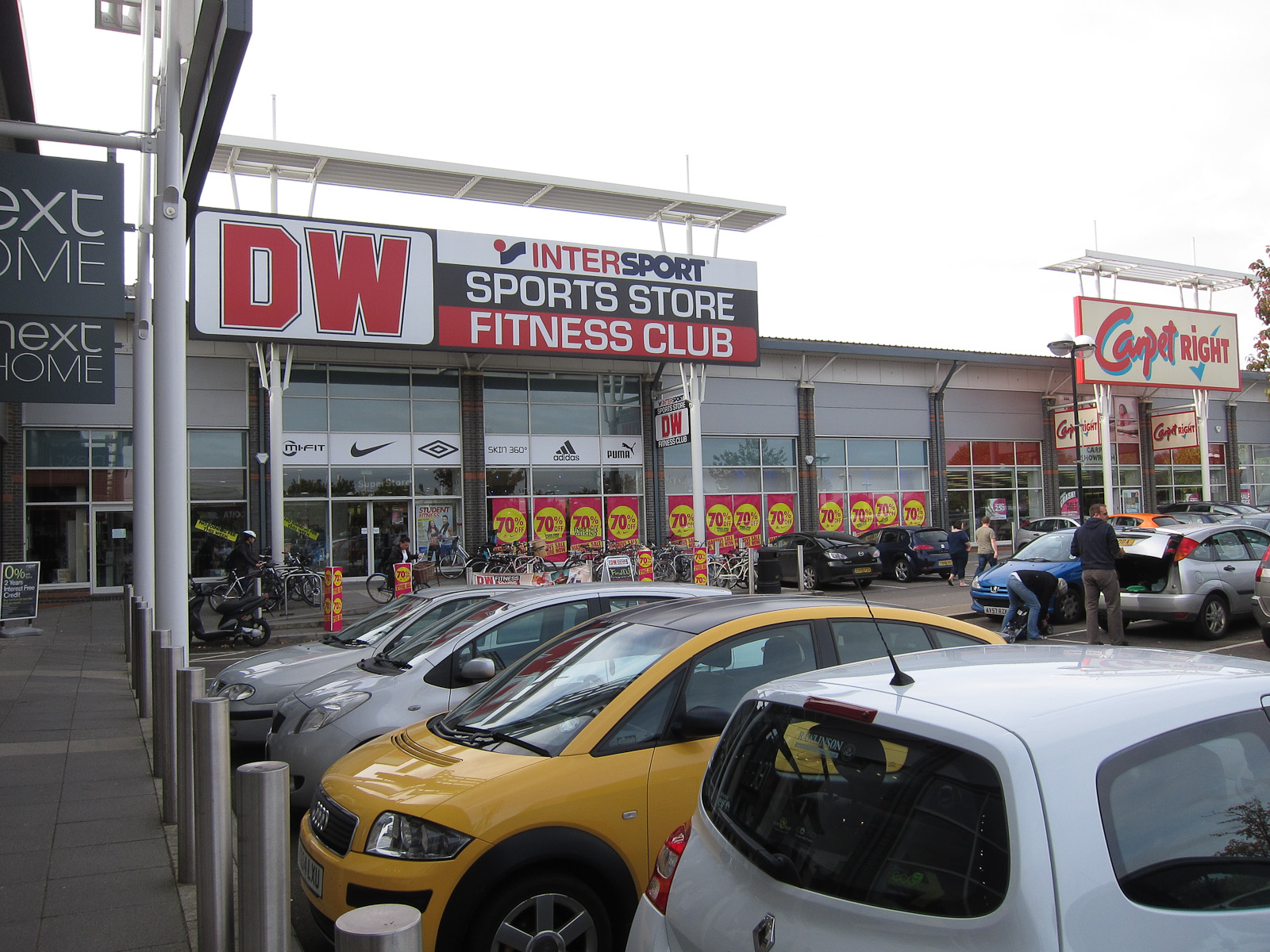
- DW Sports Store and Fitness Club, Cambridgeshire
- Industry: Retailing and fitness clubs
- Founded: 13 March 2009
- Founder: Dave Whelan
- Headquarters: Wigan, Greater Manchester, England
- Key people: Dave Whelan
- Products: Sporting goods
- Owner: Maddox Holdings Limited (trademarks)
- Website: www.dwsports.com www.dwfitnessclubs.com

DW Sports Fitness was a British retailing and fitness business, founded as a result of Dave Whelan's purchase of 50 JJB Sports fitness clubs with attached retail stores for £83.4 million in March 2009. The business would later encompass more than 140 sites, which included expansion to stand-alone retail stores and stand-alone fitness clubs. In 2011, the business joined buying group Intersport, and began using its name within its facades, and in 2016 it joint-purchased the Fitness First UK business alongside The Gym Group and Greenwich Leisure Limited.

In August 2020, it announced that DW Sports Fitness was to enter administration. A considerable number of its locations were then purchased by Frasers Group, who turned them into Everlast Fitness Club and Sports Direct locations, whilst some Fitness First locations would continue. It is understood that 922 jobs out of 1,700 were saved by Frasers Group. In May 2024, DW Stadium in Wigan was renamed to the Brick Community Stadium.

The defunct DW Sports and DW Fitness brands are owned by Maddox Holdings Limited, who own Fitness First.

== History ==
=== Retail ===
==== Association with Intersport ====
In April 2011, in an effort to boost the profile of their retail stores DW Sports joined the international buying group Intersport. As a result, the Intersport logo was incorporated into the DW Sports Fitness fascias.

==== Retail sites ====
In November 2012, the first stand-alone DW Sports retail site opened. Located at the Grand Arcade shopping centre in Wigan, it occupies the former JJB unit.

In November 2012, in the wake of JJB Sports's demise. Mike Ashley's Sports Direct was rumoured to have purchased 60 JJB sites for a reported £30 million, leaving the other 120+ stores in the former JJB portfolio. Some reports say DW Sports is not interested in acquiring any further JJB units, whilst others say that they are.

As of March 2020 the group operated 75 retail stores.

=== Fitness ===
In 2016, DW Sports Fitness acquired all 62 Fitness First clubs in the UK from Oaktree Capital Management, selling 14 of those and continuing to operate 48 under the Fitness First brand.

As of August 2020 DW Sports Fitness operated 73 gyms, 43 of them under the Fitness First brand.

=== 2020 administration ===
In June 2020 the company announced that 25 retail stores would be closing down as a result of the COVID-19 pandemic and lockdown.

On 3 August 2020 it announced that it was to enter administration with all stores eventually closing, and that it was working with the administrators to save some of the gyms from closure. The 43 gyms operating under the Fitness First brand would be unaffected by the administration as they are operated within a separate company. The website closed with immediate effect on 3 August and closing down sales started in their stores on the same day.

On 24 August 2020, it was announced that the company founded by Dave Whelan's long time rival Mike Ashley, Frasers Group, would buy 46 leisure clubs and 31 retail outlets from DW Sports Fitness for £37m, but would not be using the firm's brand name. 922 jobs out of the 1,700 would be saved as part of the Frasers Group deal.
