= The Core Shopping Centre =

The Core Shopping Centre may refer to:

- The CORE Shopping Centre in Calgary, Alberta, Canada
- The re-branded Schofields (department store) in Leeds, United Kingdom
