= Hoopers (department store) =

English department store chain

- Type: Private
- Industry: Retail
- Founded: 1982; 44 years ago in Torquay, UK
- Number of locations: 4
- Website: hoopersstores.com

Hoopers is an English department store chain founded in Torquay in 1982. It is now trading from four department stores and online.

== History ==
Though officially founded by Jane and Barry Hooper in 1982, the couple opened a small store in Torquay in 1978, exclusively selling menswear. In 1980, they moved to a larger premises and expanded into ladies fashion, attracting London businessman David Thomson and his wife, Patricia.

In 1981, Hoopers acquired Williams & Cox, an established department store overlooking Torquay's harbour. The following year they officially opened the store, also acquiring the Finnigans department store in Wilmslow in the same year.

Two further store acquisitions were made over the next 15 years; Weekes department store in Royal Tunbridge Wells in 1990, and Hewletts in Harrogate in 1996.

== Locations ==
- Harrogate, formerly Hewletts (previously Schofields, prior to that Cresta House and originally the Harrogate branch of Marshall & Snelgrove; acquired 1996)
- Torquay, formerly Williams & Cox (acquired 1982)
- Tunbridge Wells, formerly Weekes (acquired 1990)
- Wilmslow, formerly Finnigans (acquired 1982)

== Former locations ==
- Carlisle (formerly Bulloughs; acquired 2006; closed 2013)
- Cheltenham (opened 1987 in premises formerly occupied by Cheltenham's main Post Office; closed 2003; building since occupied by Waterstones)
- Chichester (opened 1988)
- Colchester (formerly the Colchester branch of Keddies, acquired as a going concern in 1987)
