= Schofields (department store) =

Department store in Leeds, England

- Type: Department store
- Industry: Retail
- Founded: 1901; 125 years ago
- Defunct: 1996; 30 years ago
- Fate: Takeover by House of Fraser
- Headquarters: Leeds, England
- Key people: Snowden Schofield, Ronald Schofield (Snowden's son, died 1969), Peter Dawson Schofield, (Snowden's son, died 1996)

Schofields was a department store that operated on the Headrow in Leeds, England, from 1901 to 1996. For much of the 20th century Schofields was regarded as being the pinnacle of shopping in Leeds city centre.

The site is now home to The Core, formerly The Headrow Centre. Schofields also had department stores in Harrogate (an acquisition of a former Debenhams department store, named Cresta House, on James Street), Skipton (an acquisition of the former Ledgard & Wynn department store) (closed 1986) and Sheffield (a 1972 acquisition of the Cockaynes department store on Angel Street). The Sheffield store closed in 1982 and now trades as a Tenpin bowling alley on the ground floor with offices on the upper floors and the Harrogate branch now trades as Hoopers. The only visible evidence pointing to the existence of Schofields in Leeds was a NCP multi-storey car park, located near to the former department store premises, on Albion Street that continued to use the name of 'Schofields Car Park' despite the demise of this department store (but was rebranded in 2009 as "The Core" car park).

== History ==
The store was founded by Snowden Schofield on Saturday 4 May 1901 in a single unit as a "fancy drapers and milliners" with a staff of two then expanded in the following years into other units. The premises were originally a mixture of Victorian era buildings which included a shopping arcade, called the Victoria Arcade, running through the store.

The Leeds store was rebuilt in 1962 in a modernist style typical of the era. In September 1984 the business was sold to Clayform Properties Ltd who had intended to redevelop the site but planning permission was not granted. In 1988 the store was sold to the Al Fayed brothers who also owned Harrods and were then owners of House of Fraser. Following this, the store, whilst retaining the Schofields name, became part of the House of Fraser chain. This led to the 1987 reconstruction of the 1960s store which included reducing the size of the actual store and creating an adjoining shopping centre which became known as the Schofields Centre. During the construction work Schofields was located on Briggate in a former Woolworths store. With the opening of the new Schofields in 1990 it was decided that the temporary store on Briggate would be retained by the company and be known as Rackhams, another trading name used by House of Fraser. The new Schofields on the Headrow closed down on 27 July 1996 due to competition from the other House of Fraser store on Briggate and as a result of consolidation by House of Fraser as a whole. This Briggate store was later rebranded as House of Fraser, which it remained until its closure in 2022. The building was subsequently demolished and, as of 2024, is being redeveloped as ground floor retail with multiple floors of student accommodation above.

As of July 2026, The Core shopping centre has been demolished in preparation for construction of new retail and student accommodation units.

== The Schofield Centre ==
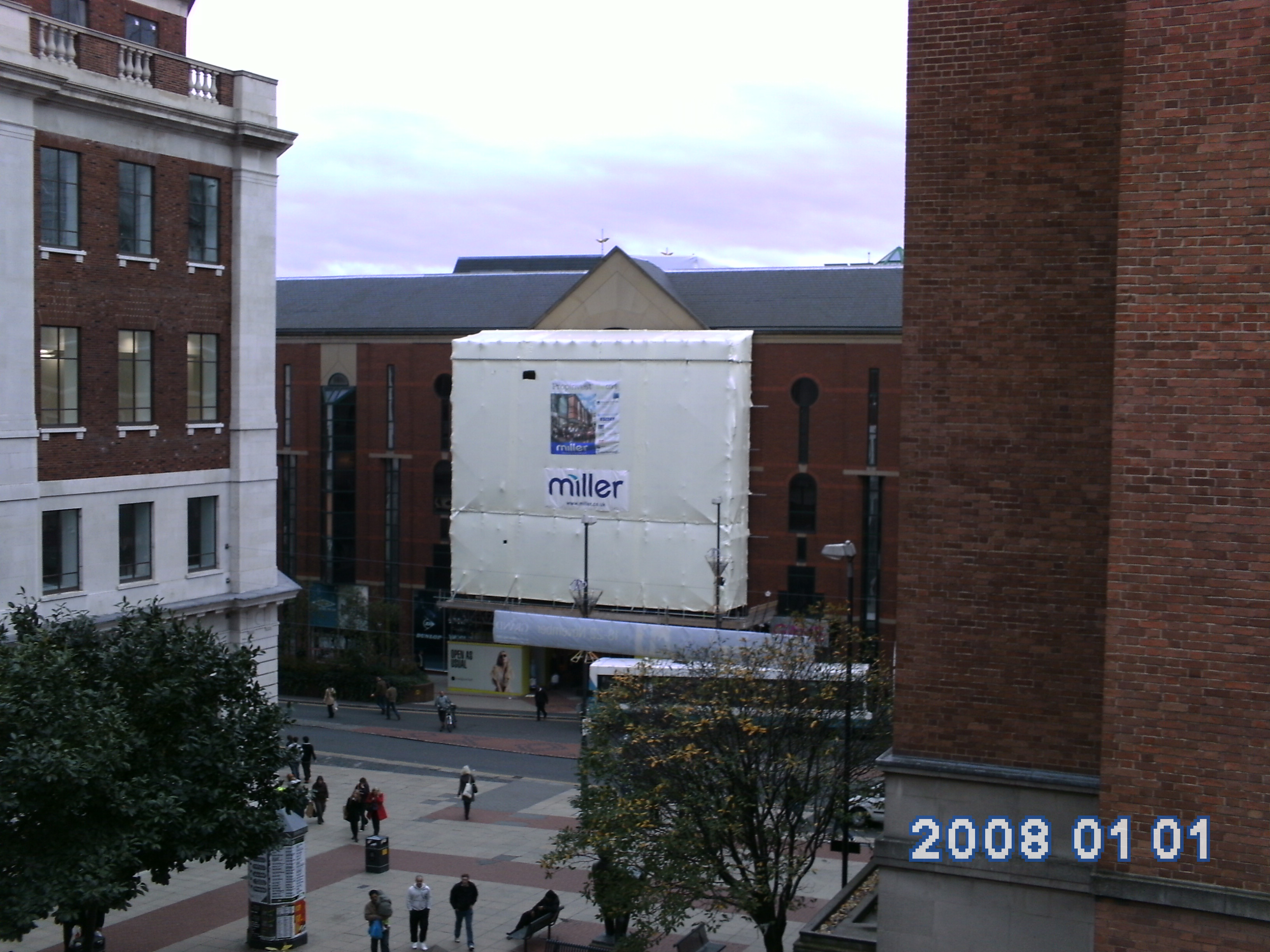
The Headrow Centre undergoing redevelopment in 2008.

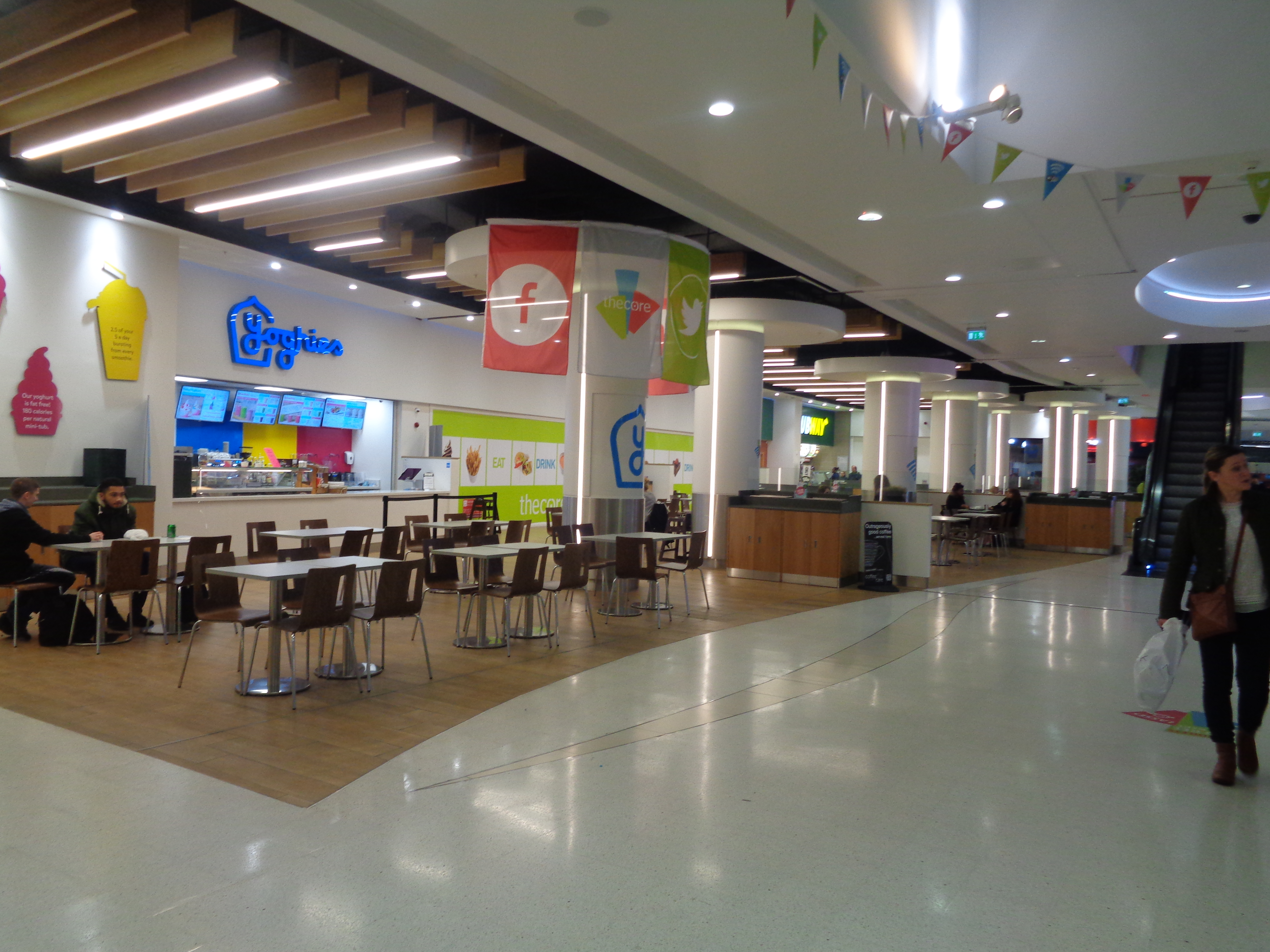
Foodcourt in the shopping centre, now the Core (December 2015).

The new Schofields Centre opened with many other retailers renting retail units. These included the thriving chain HMV and department store Marks & Spencer. The Marks & Spencer later closed this outlet due to the expansion of their premises on nearby Briggate, and HMV moved into the vacant M&S unit in around 1996.

The former Schofields premises which had become the Schofields Centre subsequently became known as The Headrow Centre. This centre had been occupied by the Lillywhites sportswear retailer between 1996 and 2001; and was later occupied by several chain stores including Sports Direct, New Look and HMV. The Headrow Centre management had let most of the tenancy agreements run out in order to redevelop the premises in the hope of attracting more businesses.

The decision to let tenancy agreements expire, whilst only giving the shops 28 days notice of the closure in most cases, had caused negative media comments to be directed towards the centre. Many of the stores that have been in the centre for up to 15 years have been forced to close down, and the staff are being given very little time to find new jobs. It was also seen as the centre was 'killing' off the small businesses in order to attract more chain stores.

The renovations were estimated to take 18 months to complete, and 10 stores remained open while the work was going on. The new centre has been finished in late 2009 and traded as The Core due to its place in the core of the city centre. The Core was now home to new stores including a combined Bank and JD Sports store, a Cotswold store and a USC sports shop. A new food court seating 500 people was intended to be located above New Look. The design features include the extensive use of glass. The developer, the Propinvest Group, has described the Leeds development as its flagship centre.

The food court in the mall; which opened in 2015, had restaurants come and go over the years, including Burger King, Roosters, El Mexicana, Pizzaway, Yoghies and Subway. However, between July 2011 and early 2025, many interior retail units within The Core remained vacant and the proposed food court had been occupied by a gymnasium which closed before demolition started.

As of March 2024, planning permission has been granted for the demolition of The Core; and its redevelopment as three separate blocks of ground floor retail with six floors of student accommodation above and new roads or pedestrian areas will be created between the blocks. Before its demolition, OneBeyond opened in the former HMV unit. During demolition, Footasylum closed its doors permanently.
