= Lillywhites =

Sports retailer based at Piccadilly Circus, London

Coordinates: 51.509455°N 0.134263°W

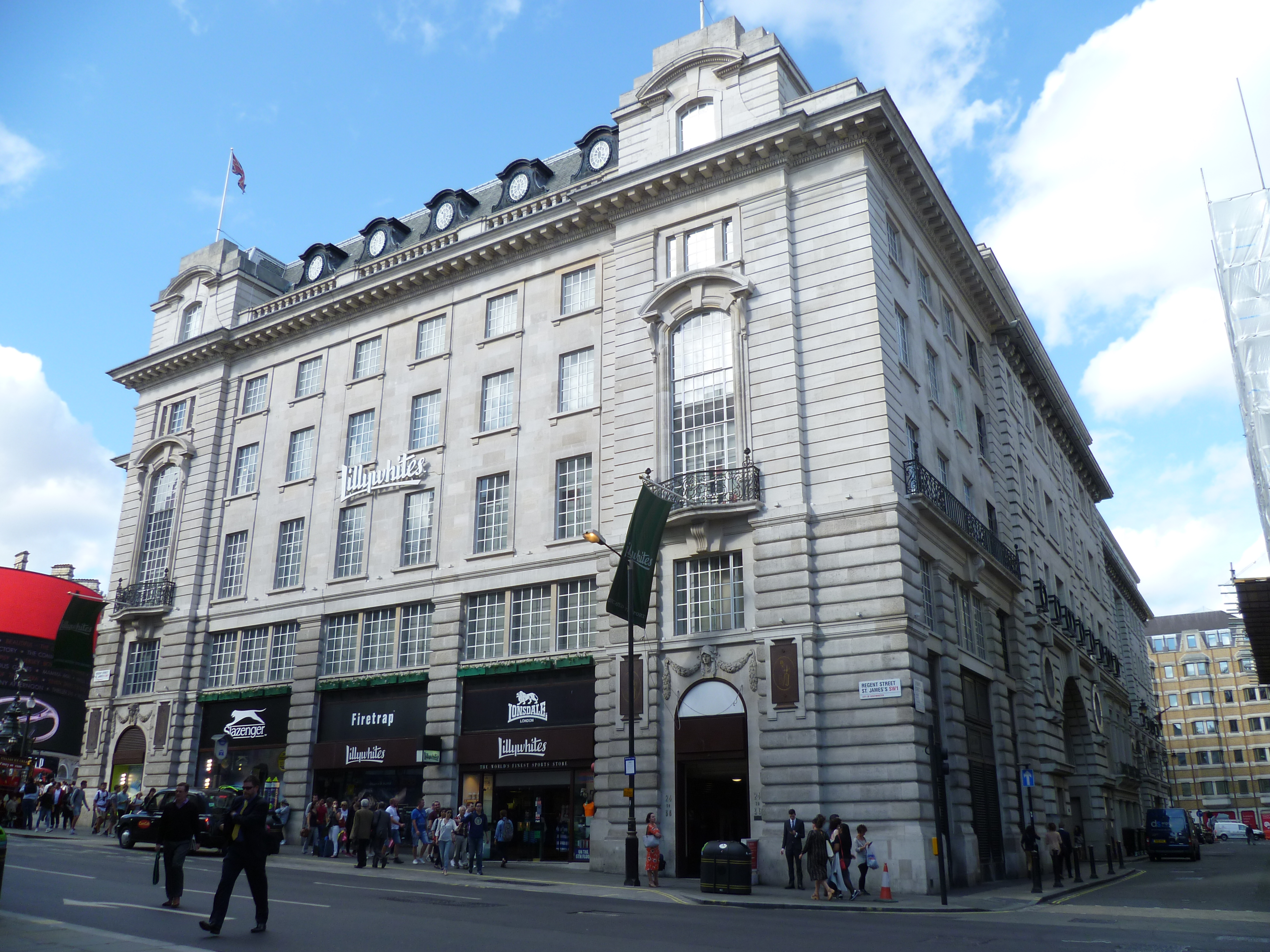
- Lillywhites at Regent Street, London, pictured in 2015
- Type: Division
- Number of locations: 2
- Area served: Piccadilly Circus (UK); Linz (Austria)
- Products: Clothing, sports equipment
- Owner: Frasers Group
- Parent: Sports Direct
- Website: lillywhites.com

Lillywhites is a sports retailer trading at Piccadilly Circus in the United Kingdom and in Linz in Austria.

It is a division of Sports Direct, owned by Frasers Group.

== History ==
In the 19th century, several members of the Lillywhite family were leading cricketers; another, Fred Lillywhite, organised the first overseas tour by an England team to North America in 1859. In 1866, the Lillywhite "No. 5" football was chosen for a London v. Sheffield challenge match organised by The Football Association; the same model in the early years of the FA Cup and was the ancestor of the International Football Association Board's modern ball specifications. In 1886, the Intercollegiate Football Association chose the Lillywhite "No. J" as the standard for American college footballs.

The shop has been based at its current location of 25 Regent St. on Piccadilly Circus since 1925, catering to the London market with specialist departments for croquet and real tennis. In 1930, Messrs Lillywhite Ltd. supplied pilot Amy Johnson with her flying kit. Lillywhites' policy was to compete on quality products (which were charged at premium prices). For many years the company was owned by Forte Group. Until 2002, Lillywhites also had locations in other major cities in the United Kingdom including Leeds, Newcastle upon Tyne and Nottingham, with the Leeds store being a large five-storey building that opened in 1996 on The Headrow in the former Schofields department store. In the same year, Lillywhites was bought by the Portuguese company Jerónimo Martins. Lillywhites lost its royal warrant in 2003.

=== Sale to Sports World ===
In the face of competition from other retailers offering more goods at lower prices, Lillywhites fell into financial difficulty. In 2002 Jerónimo Martins sold the company to Sports World International, the owner of the Sports World retail chain (later known as Sports Direct), and some of the outlying stores were rebranded as Sports World. A number of exceptions to this were the branches in Rotherham, West Thurrock, County Durham, Street, Whiteley and Bromley, all of which have since either converted to Sports Direct or closed down. Lilywhites now sells the same stock as Sports Direct.

== International operations ==
=== Austria ===
There is a Lilywhites store in Linz, Austria.

=== Kuwait (defunct) ===
In 2014, Lilywhites opened stores in Kuwait, but these have since closed down.
