= J F Dixons =

Former English department store in Southend-on-Sea

Coordinates: 51.5400°N 0.7119°E

J. F. Dixon Limited
- Type: Private company
- Industry: Retail
- Genre: Department store
- Founded: 1913
- Defunct: 1973
- Fate: Liquidation
- Headquarters: Southend-on-Sea
- Key people: J. F. Dixon

Dixons was an independent department store that opened its doors in Southend, England, during 1913 and closed for good 60 years later in 1973.

== History ==
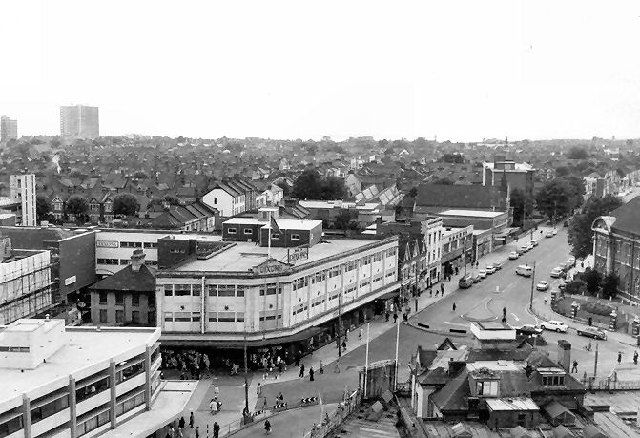
Dixons in 1969

J. F. Dixon, a draper from Upper Norwood, South London opened his own drapery store in 1913. The store was prominently located on the corner of London Road, Southend-on-Sea on what was then called The Broadway, now known as the High Street with its main competitors being Keddies, Brightwells and Thomas Brothers. Dixon was the son of a draper, John Dixon who ran his own drapery business in Gainsborough and Stoke Newington. J.F Dixon would go onto buy his father's business in Gainsborough in 1932. The Southend store was re-developed under the design of architect Mr Grover, who had previously designed the Southend stores of Garons and Ravens, with the work being completed by 1938. This included building on the site of the former Theatre Deluxe and had over 40,000 square feet in total. The store was modernised with the installation of escalators at the cost of £25,000 in 1956. In 1963 the business joined the national five day opening movement, closing on Wednesdays and opening until 8 p.m. on Fridays. During the 60s, Dixons was innovative with its advertising having mannequins on display in glass boxes in Southend High Street, while in 1968 the store opened a new department aimed at younger females called Tomorrow's Girl on the first floor. The Gainsborough and Southend businesses were closed voluntary by John F. Dixon in 1972 and 1973. Dixon himself would lead the fundraising for the Palace Theatre trust in 1980, and the new studio was named Dixon Studio after him.

== The buildings today ==
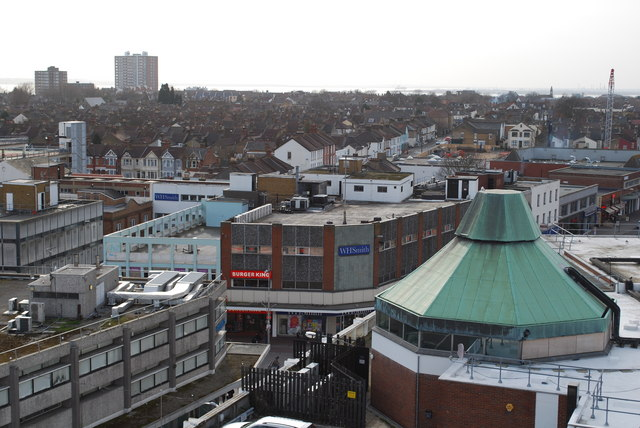
The building in 2009

The store's buildings were purchased by the Hammerson group in 1974 and split into three retail units. It is today occupied by Burger King, Caddies, Toy n Tuck (Queens Road) and the Lawrence Matthews Art Shop (Queens Road) after the closure by TGJones. J F Dixons was not related to Dixons Retail (now Dixons Carphone Warehouse), also started in Southend.
