= Republic (retailer) =

British clothing retailer

- Formerly: Dawnstretch Limited (1986-1988); Best Company (U.K) Limited (1988-2003); Republic Retail Limited (2003-2013)
- Type: Private
- Industry: Fashion retail
- Fate: 13 February 2013; 13 years ago (entered into administration); 28 February 2013; 13 years ago (assets bought by Frasers Group); 18 June 2013; 13 years ago (merged with USC)
- Successor: USC
- Headquarters: Leeds, England
- Number of locations: 114 stores (2013)
- Area served: United Kingdom
- Key people: Tim Whitworth, Carl Brewins, David Kelly
- Brands: SoulCal & Co; Miso; Crafted; Fabric; White Label; @Republic
- Revenue: ▼£177.47 million (2012)
- Operating income: ▼£3.732 million (2012)
- Number of employees: approx 2,177 (2013)
- Parent: Change Capital (2005-2010); TPG Capital (2010-2013); Sports Direct International (2013)
- Website: www.republic.co.uk

Republic was a clothing retailer with 121 stores in the United Kingdom. In February 2013, it entered administration, and was purchased by Sports Direct International. Republic was merged into Sports Direct's USC brand.

== History ==
Founded in 1985, as Just Jeans, after 1990, the name changed to Best Jeanswear; Republic was launched in 1998. It was a private limited company (Republic (Retail) Ltd.) and, in 2005, Change Capital invested in the company to finance expansion plans. In May 2011 the company was bought by private equity firm TPG Capital for £300m

=== Administration and acquisition ===
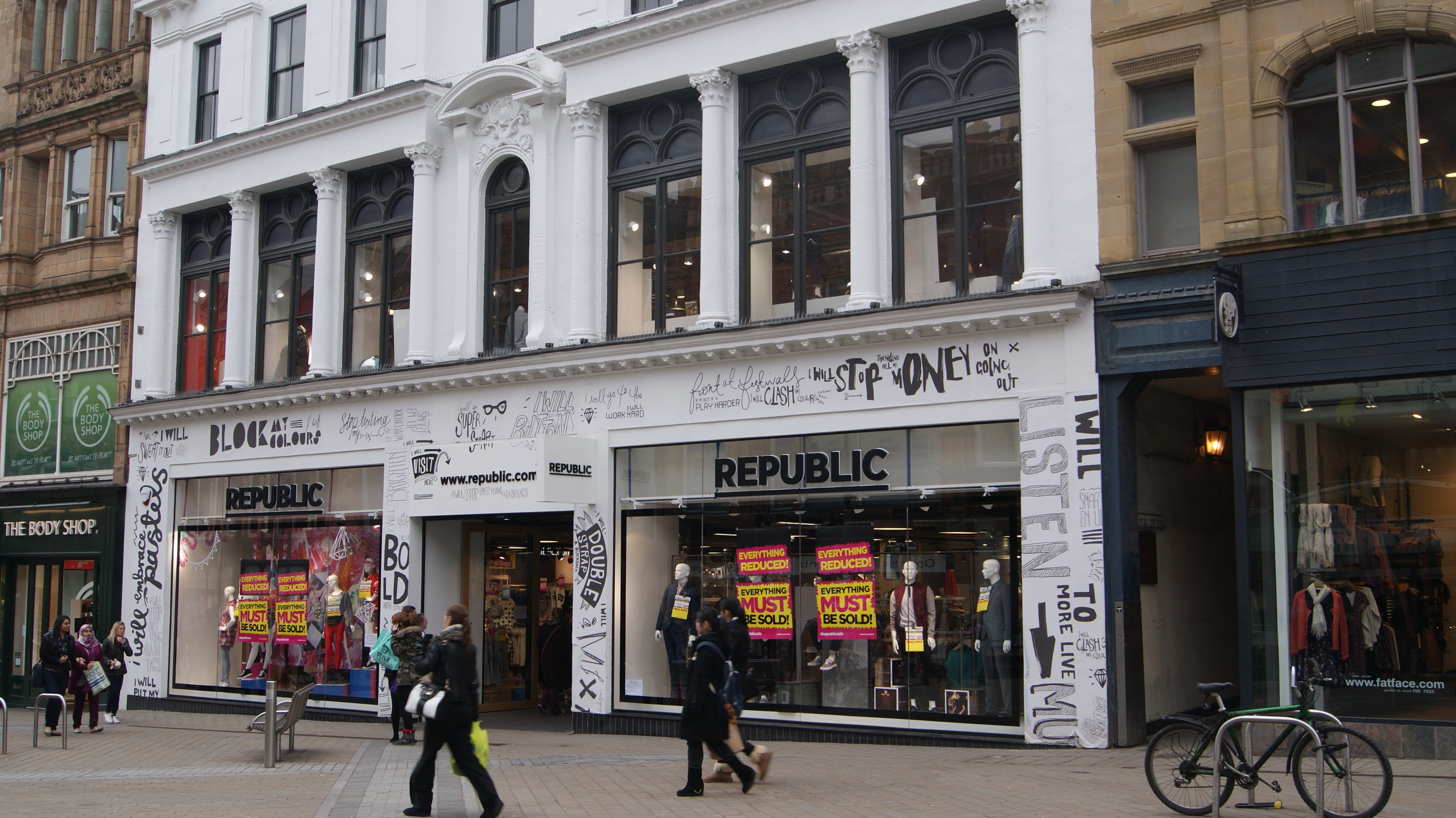
Republic on Briggate, Leeds

Republic filed for administration on 13 February 2013, with Ernst & Young appointed administrators. 150 head office staff were immediately made redundant, leaving 2,500 jobs at risk. During the administration time, a total of 8 Republic stores closed, 5 in Scotland, with a further 2 closed in Northern Ireland and one in Middlesbrough, England.

On 28 February 2013, Sports Direct bought 114 Republic stores, the brand name, all remaining stock and own-brands including SoulCal, Crafted and Fabric from the administrators. The Republic head office was also purchased.

Sports Direct attempted to negotiate a reduction in rent for a number of stores, but the proposal was rejected by its landlords for those stores: Intu and Land Securities. As a result, 20 stores were closed. The remaining Republic stores were subsequently merged with USC.

== Position ==
The company was positioned in the mass sector of the clothing market, and had a focus on young fashionlines were stocked from casual brands including Bench, Fenchurch, G-Star Raw, American Apparel, Henleys and Drunknmunky, as well as own brands SoulCal & Co, Miso, Crafted, Fabric, and ex-brand White Label. Before entering administration, Republic introduced a new own-branded line, @Republic, which transferred to USC.
