= Heart Essex (Chelmsford & Southend) =

Former commercial radio station in Essex, United Kingdom

- Basildon, Chelmsford, Harlow, and Southend-on-Sea; England
- Broadcast area: Essex
- Frequencies: 96.1 (Colchester); 96.3 (Basildon); 97.5 (Southend-on-Sea); 101.7 (Harlow and Bishop's Stortford); 102.6 (Chelmsford)
- RDS: HEART_SX
- Branding: This is Heart

Programming
- Format: Hot Adult Contemporary

Ownership
- Owner: Global Radio

History
- First air date: 12 September 1981
- Last air date: 1 June 2019
- Former names: Essex Radio (1981–1994); Essex FM (1994–2009)

Links
- Website: Heart Essex

Heart Essex (formerly Essex Radio and then Essex FM) was an Independent Local Radio station, serving the county of Essex and parts of East Hertfordshire. It was launched on 12 September 1981, broadcasting from Southend-on-Sea and since 27 October 2004 from Chelmsford, both in Essex.

== History ==
Essex FM logo used from 2007 to 2009

Heart began as Essex Radio in September 1981 broadcasting on 95.3 MHz & 1431 kHz to Southend-on-Sea and 96.4 MHz & 1359 kHz to Chelmsford in December 1981. The station was formed by several local companies including Keddies, Garons & TOTS with David Keddie, owner of the Keddies department store in Southend becoming its chairman. The station's FM frequencies were changed in 1986, with 95.3 becoming 96.3 (95.3 was handed to BBC Essex) and 96.4 becoming 102.6.

In 1989 the station split its AM and FM frequencies (as required then to do so due to a new Radio Act requirement to end simulcasting) and The Breeze began broadcasting on Essex Radio's old AM frequencies. The first song played was Cliff Richard's 'Wired for Sound'. In January 1994 Essex Radio relaunched as Essex FM. It was then rebranded as Heart in June 2009.

Essex Radio Group launched several nearby stations, including Ten-17 FM in Harlow in 1993, oldies station Breeze (now Smooth Essex) in July 1989, and dance station Vibe FM (now Kiss FM) in 1997. Essex FM became part of the GWR Group (now Global Radio) in October 2000 from the Daily Mail and General Trust (who bought the Essex Radio Group in 1998).

Programme controller Craig Denyer introduced the Greatest Memories Latest Hits format in the late eighties. The format was launched on April Fool's Day when presenters supposedly went on strike because of the format. Station identification was provided by Airforce Productions. They were also responsible for the earlier 'Together we can Make it' package.

Essex FM's Creative Team (founded 1987) helped win awards for advertising and soundtracks, including Creative Circle Honours, Independent Radio Advertising Awards and a bronze in the Sony Awards for 'Now in 1939' a contemporary musical documentary to commemorate World War 2. Commercial producers included John Calvert, Carolyn Rogers, Lisa Rutherford, Scott Young, Chris Slack & Pete Sipple.

=== Later years ===
Since GWR bought Essex FM in 2000 and following the merger of GWR and the Capital Radio Group in 2005 to form GCap Media, Essex FM started to take some network programmes, like the weekday evening new music show Music Control. Essex FM however was one of only two or three One Network stations (the GCap media station network) which retained most of its local output, opting out of shows like Late Night Love and The Jeremy Kyle Show. They also broadcast their own jingles – made by ReelWorld in Seattle, based on their package for Hallam FM.

However, in June 2008 new owners Global Radio, in spite of the station just obtaining its best listening figures for 5 years with a music format slightly more skewed to new music, decided to include Essex FM in their plans for a huge radio shake-up. The station was forced to drop its non-peak time local programming, including weekdays mid-mornings and late night.

On Monday 29 June, the station changed its music style to an older approach and introduced a format more like London station Heart 106.2 and dropped off its sung jingles – effectively a clean slate. The station's strapline was changed to "More Music Variety".

In May 2009 the station began calling itself The Heart of Essex – Essex FM', and began to use the Heart news and travel beds, as well as jingles (IDs as Essex FM over what would normally be 'This is Heart'). On 22 June 2009, Essex FM was officially branded Heart Essex.

=== Network restructuring ===
On 21 June 2010, Global Radio announced plans to merge Heart Essex with Heart Colchester and Ten 17 as part of plans to restructuring plans for the Heart Network. The new station, Heart Essex, begun broadcasting from Chelmsford on 26 July 2010.

=== Closure ===
In February 2019, Heart Essex's owners, Global Radio announced a major shake-up of radio across all of their brands. In the case of Heart Essex, these changes were to take effect from Saturday 1 June. The new schedule would mean the complete closure of Heart Essex. The very last show broadcast from Chelmsford aired between 16:00-19:00 BST on Friday 31 May 2019. After this show, all programmes were network programmes broadcast from the main studios in Leicester Square, London. The exception to this was the 16:00-19:00 drive time show on Mondays-Fridays, which is broadcast on new station Heart East, which is broadcast from studios in Milton Keynes.

== Transmitters ==
The 102.6 MHz FM signal comes from Baker's Wood west of Chelmsford. This broadcasts to Chelmsford, Braintree, Witham, Maldon and South Woodham Ferrers. It is the strongest signal with an effective radiated power of 2.0 kW. 96.3 MHz FM comes from Benfleet, which covers Basildon and most of southern Essex with an ERP of 1.3 kW. 97.5 MHz FM comes from Maitland House in central Southend with an ERP of 100 W. This was launched in the late 90s to fill a gap in the town centre. In Harlow, Heart East broadcasts on 101.7 MHz from the Rye Hill mast, with Colchester being served by the Wivenhoe transmitter broadcasting on 96.1 MHz with an ERP of 500 watts. Heart East is also available on DAB Digital Radio via the Essex multiplex.
