= Chris Ronnie =

British businessman and convicted fraudster (born c. 1962)

Christopher Ronnie (born 1961/62) is a British businessman and convicted fraudster, chief executive officer of JJB Sports from June 2007 to March 2009, when he was fired for failing to disclose the sale of his stake in the company within the required four days. In February 2009, Ronnie's lawyers said that he "has always maintained that he has not knowingly breached any disclosure obligations in relation to his shareholding" and stated Ronnie had "tendered a letter of resignation conditional upon reaching an agreement on the terms of a settlement." JJB rejected this resignation as no agreement had been met.

Ronnie had previously worked for Umbro, Sports Direct International, Pentland Group and Blane Leisure Limited.

In October 2010 Ronnie held discussions with DW Sports about purchasing the retail business from Dave Whelan's company. However, DW decided not to sell the business and issued a statement to that effect.

== 2014 fraud conviction ==
Ronnie appeared at Westminster Magistrates' Court in London on Wednesday 4 April 2012 charged with fraud, theft and money laundering. He appeared alongside a clothing manufacturer who was a key supplier to the sports retailer during Ronnie's tenure as chief executive of JJB between August 2007 and March 2009. The two arrests were the culmination of a three-year investigation by the Serious Fraud Office, which said investigations into possible offences committed by other suspects were ongoing.

On 20 November 2014, Ronnie was convicted of three counts of fraud and two of furnishing false information. He was sentenced in December 2014 to four and a half years in jail, and banned indefinitely from acting as a company director.
