= Dave Whelan =

English businessman (born 1936)

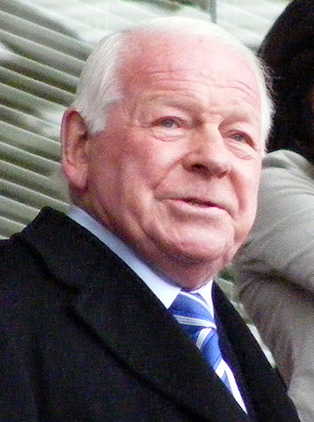
- Whelan in 2010

Personal information
- Full name: David Whelan
- Date of birth: 24 November 1936 (age 89)
- Place of birth: Bradford, England
- Position: Full-back

Senior career*
Years	Team	Apps	(Gls)
1956–1960	Blackburn Rovers	78	(3)
1962–1966	Crewe Alexandra	115	(0)
Total		193	(3)
- * Club domestic league appearances and goals

David Whelan (born 24 November 1936) is an English businessman and former footballer. During his football career, he played for Blackburn Rovers and Crewe Alexandra. Whelan is the former owner of club Wigan Athletic, having also been the chairman of the club for twenty years, before passing the position over to his grandson, David Sharpe, who eventually passed the ownership over to International Entertainment Corporation.

== Early life ==
Whelan was born in Bradford and raised in Wigan. His forebears hailed from County Tipperary, Ireland.

== Football career ==
Whelan played 78 times as a left back, scoring three times for Blackburn Rovers and was a member of its 1960 FA Cup Final team, which lost 3–0 to Wolverhampton Wanderers. Whelan himself did not complete the game, a feisty challenge from Whelan on Norman Deeley culminated in the Blackburn man being withdrawn before half time after suffering a broken leg. Whelan's injury is one of many serious injuries suffered by players in the 1950–60 era and was known as the Wembley hoodoo. Following his leg break, Whelan was sold to Crewe Alexandra, where he made his debut on 23 February 1963 in a 4–0 first round League Cup defeat at Port Vale, and notched up 115 appearances through to April 1966. He then retired to concentrate on developing a retail grocery business.

== Ownerships ==
=== Whelan Discount Stores ===
Whelan started out a market stall on Wigan market after working with Haworth Brothers on their stall in Blackburn. He later progressed into a grocers, before visiting America where he studied the self-service supermarket. He returned to England and set about creating a supermarket chain. By the late 1960s the business had 10 stores based across Lancashire. In 1978 Whelan sold the business to Morrisons for £1.5 million.

=== JJB Sports ===
Whelan acquired a Wigan based fishing and sports store JJ Bradburns in 1971. He continued to use the company name JJB Sports (JJB are the initials of the two previous owners John Jarvis Broughton, followed by J J Bradburn) and continued the retail of sports goods. By 1980, JJB had seven stores, and continued to expand throughout the 80s and 90s, to become the UK's second biggest sports retailer, focused mainly on sports clothing.

In 2005, JJB Sports was fined £5.5 million by the Office of Fair Trading (OFT) for fixing the price of the English National Team and Manchester United shirts in 2000 and 2001. Which? (the Consumers' Association) issued proceedings against JJB, suing for damages on behalf of consumers affected by the price fixing. Whelan gradually scaled down his interests in the company, and in 2005 stepped down as chairman. However, in October 2006, he personally intervened to overturn the settlement of a pay dispute at JJB's Wigan warehouse negotiated by new chairman Tom Knight, branding it "the equivalent of Communism", prompting a two-day strike.

In January 2007 Whelan sold £50m worth of shares in JJB, before selling his remaining 29% stake in June 2007. This action was in breach of an agreement Whelan had with the stock exchange on 26 January 2007, whereby he undertook to make no further disposals for the following 12 months.

=== DW Sports Fitness ===
In March 2009, Whelan acquired back troubled JJB's nationwide chain of fitness clubs and stores. Wigan Athletic's stadium became the DW Stadium and their new sponsor, DW Sports Fitness, taking the initials of its owner and his new company.

=== Wigan Athletic F.C. ===
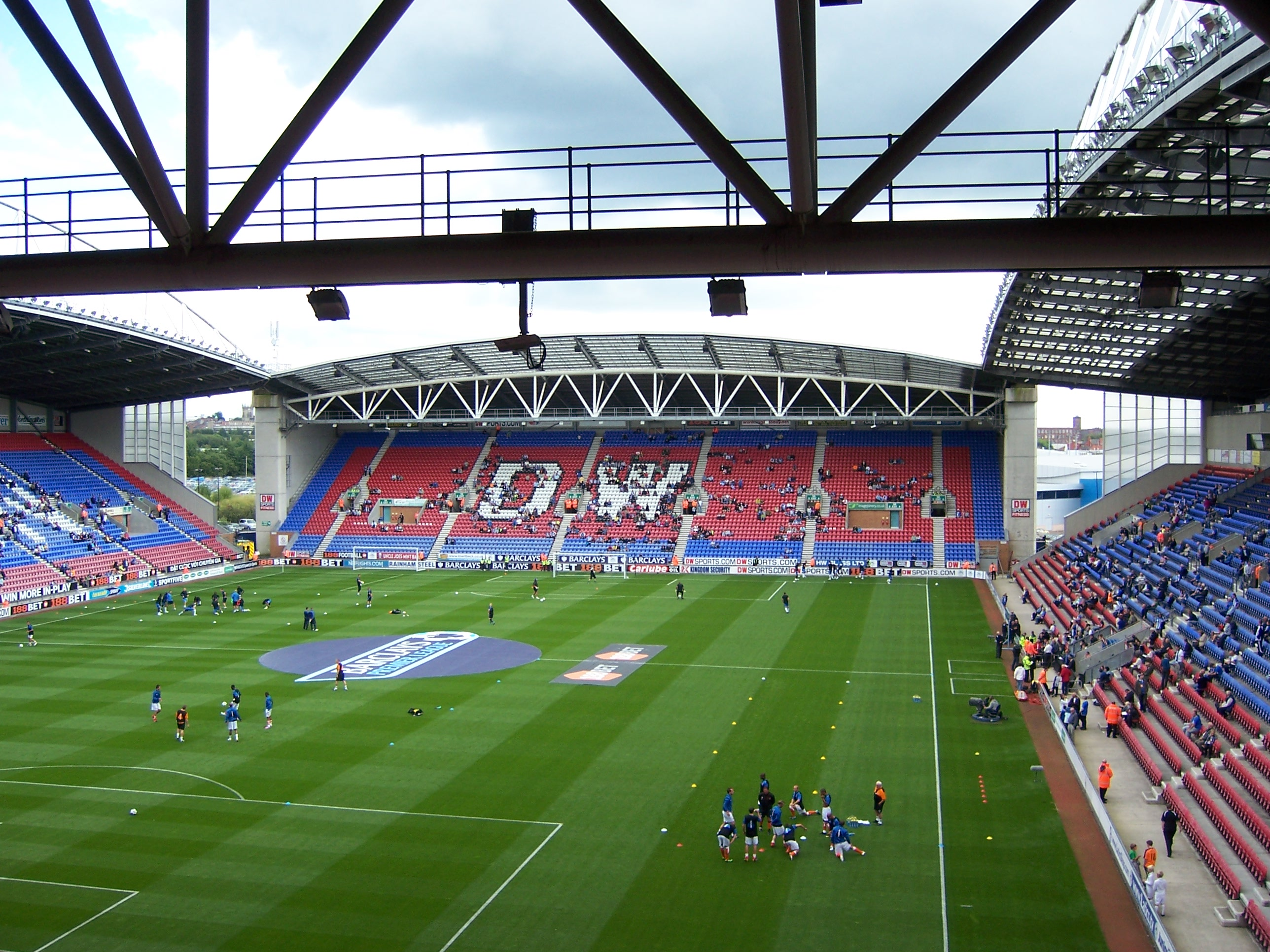
Whelan funded the DW Stadium, home of Wigan Athletic and Wigan Warriors

Whelan bought Wigan Athletic in February 1995, when they were a Division Three team. After Whelan took the reins he announced that he would get Wigan Athletic into the Premier League, a promise he fulfilled in 2005. This began with the Division Three title in 1996–97, the Division Two title in 2002–03 and promotion to the Premiership as Championship runners-up in 2004–05. He funded the £30 million construction of the club's new JJB Stadium (now the Brick Community Stadium) which opened in 1999 and on its completion was one of the largest football stadiums outside the Premier League.

Wigan, who were tipped to be relegated from the Premier League in their first season, not only managed to stay up (and remained in the top flight for eight years), but claimed a 10th place league position and also reached the final of the Football League Cup.

In 2005, Whelan threatened to quit the club unless the price of policing games was reduced.

In 2007, he called for the relegation of West Ham United as punishment for their incorrect registration of Carlos Tevez and Javier Mascherano. He subsequently called for Premier League Chairman Dave Richards and chief executive Richard Scudamore to resign.

An arbitration committee met to consider the affair. It ruled in favour of the Premier League. Wigan managed an end-of-season victory at Sheffield United, a 2–1 win with the goals being scored by Paul Scharner in the 14th minute and a penalty from David Unsworth in injury time of the first half, after Jon Stead had equalised for Sheffield United in the 38th minute. It was a dramatic final-day Premiership survival story, with the result saving Wigan and condemning Sheffield United to the Championship.

On 11 May 2013, in a dramatic ending to the FA Cup Final against Manchester City, Ben Watson scored a header in the 91st minute to win the game 1–0. This was Wigan's first major trophy in their history and gave Whelan the chance to hold the FA Cup trophy, 53 years after breaking his leg as a 1960 finalist. Three days later, a defeat to Arsenal saw Wigan relegated to the Championship, ending a spell of eight years in the Premier League. On 3 March 2015, Whelan stepped down as chairman, appointing his 23-year-old grandson, David Sharpe, as the new chairman.

=== Wigan Warriors ===
After the announcement of Maurice Lindsay's intention to retire immediately from the club after the Warriors' loss at the hands of Catalans Dragons on 29 July 2007, Whelan managed to persuade him to stay on until the end of the season. After the announcement of Lindsay's retirement however, Whelan said he would be willing to sell the club after a proposed takeover from a "genuine Wigan fan" earlier in the year.

On 24 October 2007, it was announced that Ian Lenagan, former owner of Harlequins RL, had completed his takeover of Wigan Warriors, buying out Whelan's 89% stake in the club with the deal taking effect from 1 December 2007.

=== Orrell Rugby Union Club ===
Wigan Warriors Rugby League Club Chairman Maurice Lindsay and business tycoon Dave Whelan, the then owner of the JJB Sports empire, had already been making noises about forming a rugby union side. Initial contact was made via Whelan's Finance Director Simon Moorehead and members were promised £10,000,000 investment over 5 years, with Mr Whelan expressing the dream to be drinking red wine away to Toulouse in the European Cup in the not-too-distant future. Wide-eyed, and with these promises of future success, the members reluctantly sold their shares in the club for £1,000 each, to the new owners, with Lindsay becoming the club's new Chairman.

== Politics ==
A supporter of the Conservative Party, Whelan has donated in total £1.5 million to the party since 2007, with his most recent donation of £100,000 made in August 2014. He said David Cameron had his full support.

In 2013, he called for a mandatory minute's silence at all football games to mark the death of Margaret Thatcher. The Football Association rejected the proposal.

== Controversies ==
In November 2014, Whelan was accused of making antisemitic statements, following an interview he gave The Guardian, defending his decision to hire Malky Mackay as manager of Wigan. Mackay was under investigation by the FA for alleged racism and antisemitism in e-mails and text messages he sent while manager of Cardiff City. During the interview, Whelan was quoted as saying "Jewish people chase money more than everybody else." The statements were condemned by West Ham United co-chairman David Gold and former FA and Premier League executive Simon Johnson, both of whom are Jewish. Whelan was also accused of racist attitudes by defending Mackay's alleged referral to Chinese people as "chinks". Cardiff City owner, Vincent Tan, who is Malaysian Chinese, said of Whelan, "I think he has insulted the dignity of the Chinese". Whelan later apologised for his remarks. Anti-racist organisation Kick It Out offered support to Whelan, saying that they had a responsibility to ensure that people of his age would understand "modern expectations".

Whelan threatened to leave his position at Wigan if the FA found him guilty of racism. At the first match since the controversy, on 22 November against Middlesbrough, he was applauded by Wigan fans as he took his seat in the DW Stadium.

On 27 November, the FA charged Whelan with an aggravated breach of FA Rule E3 [2], as his comments had included "a reference to ethnic origin and/or race and/or nationality and/or religion or belief". He was given a six-week ban and fined £50,000 on 31 December, although the FA investigation concluded that he was neither a racist nor had intended to cause offence. In March the following year, Whelan resigned his position as Wigan chairman, naming as replacement his grandson, David Sharpe, with the Whelan family remaining as majority shareholders.

== Honours ==
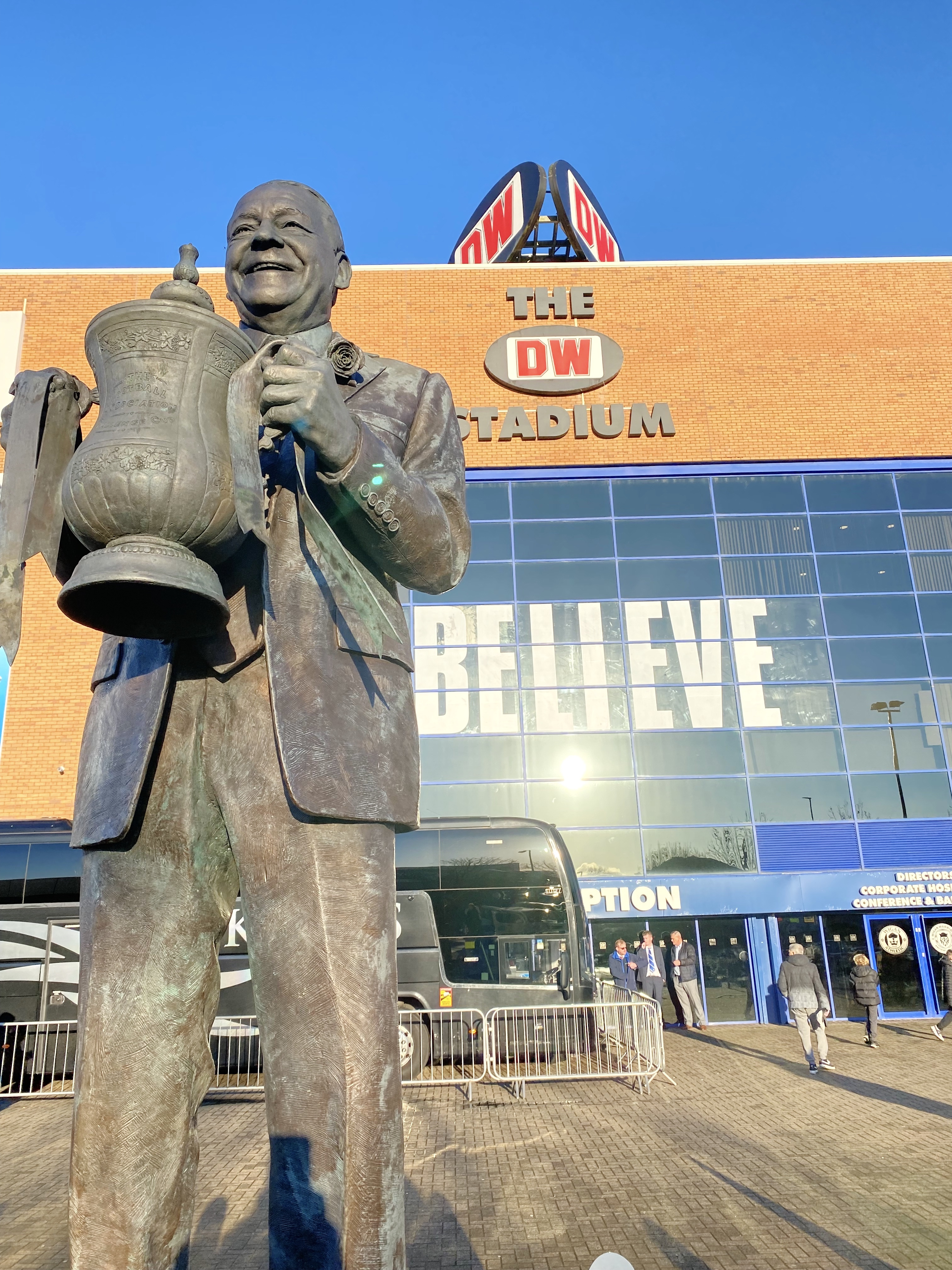
Dave Whelan statue outside the DW Stadium

=== As a player ===
Blackburn Rovers

- FA Cup runner-up: 1959–60

=== As an owner ===
Wigan Athletic

- Football League Second Division: 2002–03
- Football League Third Division: 1996–97
- FA Cup: 2012–13
- Football League Championship second-place promotion: 2004–05
- Football League Cup runner-up: 2005–06

Individual

- On 30 August 2007 He was awarded the Freedom of the Borough of Wigan by Wigan Borough Council.
- In July 2015 He was awarded the Honorary degree of Doctor of Business Administration (DBA) by the University of Bolton.
