= Brightwells =

Former department store in Southend

Coordinates: 51.5346°N 0.7137°E

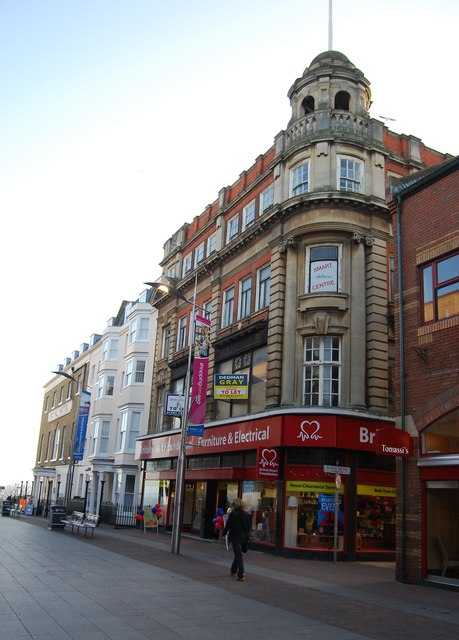
Former Brightwells Store in 2012

Brightwells was a department store in Southend-on-Sea, England. The store was founded by John Rumbelow Brightwell and opened on the city's High Street in the 19th century as a drapery. This became a department store which was incorporated in 1909 as J.R. Brightwell Ltd. Its direct competitors were Keddies, J F Dixons and Thomas Brothers.

John Brightwell had been an alderman of the county borough of Southend-on-Sea and twice the Mayor of Southend. The business was sold to Percy & Francis Barnes in 1925. A year later John Brightwell died, at the age of 78.

The store closed in the late 1970s and the building, which had 12,200 square foot of space over four floors, was purchased for £250,000 by Ketts Electrical in 1979. Ketts Electrical closed in the 1980s after it was purchased by Rumbelows. The Store remained empty in 1980s, however a gym opened on the 2nd floor.

The store was home to the British Heart Foundation until 2015, when both the gym and store were vacated to make way for an apartment development called the Drapery, named in reference to Brightwells.
