= Sports Division =

UK Sport retailer

- Company type: Public company
- Industry: Retail
- Founded: 1984
- Defunct: 1998
- Successor: JJB Sports
- Products: Clothing, sportswear, sports equipment

Sports Division was one of the biggest sports retailers in the United Kingdom during the 1990s.

The company was set up by Sir Tom Hunter in 1984 to sell trainers, initially from the back of a van. Hunter subsequently borrowed £5,000 from his father and a further £5,000 from RBS to set up Sports Division.

In November 1995, Hunter, along with business partner Philip Green, purchased larger rival Olympus Sports from Sears, and integrated them into the Sports Division brand.

In 1998, following a dramatic reduction in sales, Sports Division postponed coming to the market as planned. In July of that year, the business was sold to its main competitor, JJB Sports, for approximately £295 million.
