= Palace Theatre, Westcliff-on-Sea =

Theatre in the city of Southend-on-Sea

Coordinates: 51.5438°N 0.6919°E

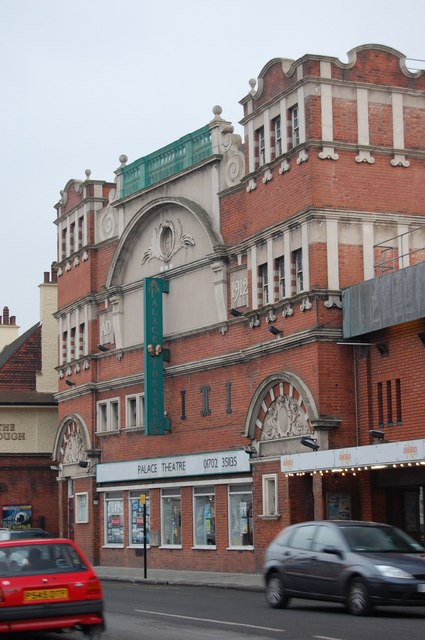
Palace Theatre, Westcliff-on-Sea

Palace Theatre logo

The Palace Theatre is a theatre in Westcliff-on-Sea a suburb in the city of Southend-on-Sea in the county of Essex, England. The theatre presents a range of performances, including drama, music and both local and national touring companies.

The theatre was built by Ward & Ward of London and was opened in October 1912. It was named the "Palace of Varieties" in November that year. In December it was renamed "The New Palace" and a small annexe at the back of the stage was built to facilitate projection for cinema. In the interwar period the theatre mainly presented touring ballet and repertory companies. The theatre and its business continued through World War II, however there were some financial troubles and a period of closure, and a number of companies held the lease of the theatre thereafter.

In 1957 the Palace Theatre Club was created with the intention to protect the interests of the theatre and raise funds for it. In 1969 the Palace Theatre suffered a major financial crisis and was closed, however a petition by the Palace Theatre Club led to its reopening in 1970 and the establishment of the Palace Theatre Trust. The theatre received extensive redecorations in 1973, gained the addition of the adjacent building to the theatre as known as the Dixon Studio (named after the chair of the Trust John Dixon) in 1980, and was further redecoration in 1986. However, in March 1999 the theatre was closed again, but was reopened in 2001 under new management. The theatre was closed in 2002 when the management left without explanation, however it reopened again in 2003 under the newly formed Southend Theatres, the result of a merger of the Cliffs Pavilion and the Palace Theatre.

== History ==
=== The Palace of Varieties ===
The theatre opened on Monday 21 October 1912 and named as the "Palace of Varieties" on 14 November. The theatre was built by Ward & Ward of London and was owned by Mr. Raymond of the Raymond Picture Company who also controlled 14 other cinemas and theatres. By the standards of the day, it was a modern building, claiming to be the only building of its time to be fitted so that "no matter from what part of the building spectators look up to the stage, there is a clear and uninterrupted view". It seated 1500 compared to 603 today.

=== The New Palace ===
In December 1912 the Theatre was renamed as "The New Palace", presenting a forerunner of the TV talent show Opportunity Knocks. In 1919 Mrs Gertude Mouillot bought the theatre for £25,000, intending to open it as a cinema but owing to the steep "rake" of the circle, it was impossible to project pictures from the front. Accordingly, a small annexe was constructed at the back of the stage and rear projection was used. Unfortunately this meant that any films shown had to be run all the way through on to a blank reel to make it the right way round for the audience and then re-run again afterwards to make it right for the next person hiring it. The annexe is still there today and greatly used.

Between the two World Wars the theatre mainly presented touring ballet and repertory companies which included many famous stars for the day: Ivor Novello, Matheson Lang, John Clements, Ruth Draper, Lillian Braithwaite and Sybil Thorndike. Throughout the Second World War the theatre managed to generate an atmosphere of business as usual, and the building survived the air raids without serious damage.

=== The Palace Theatre Club ===
As a result of some financial troubles the theatre suffered a period of closure and in 1942 Mrs Mouilott presented the theatre to the Southend Corporation, on the caveat that it could still be used by local drama societies. The Harry Hanson Court Players, who included a newcomer in the name of Dora Bryan, performed the opening play. In 1957 the Palace Theatre Club was created dedicated "to encourage interest in all aspects of living theatre and, in particular, the Palace Theatre". The Club still thrives today and helps fundraise to keep the Palace open. Over several years, a number of other companies held the lease of the theatre and in 1965 Alexander Bridge was the tenant followed by Ray Cooney.

=== Financial crisis and redevelopment ===
Crisis came to the Palace in 1969 when money problems mounted and Haymarket Stage Productions announced their final show – The Last Laugh, and the theatre then shut. The Palace Theatre Club swung into action and over 2000 signed a petition which was presented to the Council together with 1400 letters in support of the club's campaign. A protest march through the streets was held.

As a result, in 1970 Southend Borough Council set up the Palace Theatre Trust which registered as a charity secured the task of establishing a repertory theatre in Southend. Ray Cooney opened the theatre with a production of Spider's Web, and thereafter the repertory seasons were produced under three successive artistic directors: Tony Clayton, Leslie Lawton and Christopher Dunham, the last of whom spent over 25 years at the theatre.

In 1973 Southend Council made generous donations to the Trust and the theatre was extensively redecorated.

The theatre was designated as a Grade II listed building on 23 August 1974.

In 1980 the theatre had an opportunity to obtain the property adjoining the west of the building and with considerable help from the Appeal committee set up to raise funds for the redevelopment, led by John F Dixon, half the cost supplied by Southend Council and a contribution from the Arts Council of England, the foyer, courtyard, workshop and wardrobe were built together with the Dixon Studio – a smaller auditorium with space for up to 100 patrons. The box office was moved to the new foyer which contains a large public bar and a small bistro. The alterations had cost £314,000. The Palace re-opened in 1982 as the Palace Theatre Centre with a Gala Night performance of Cabaret. In September of that year the Dixon opened with Duct for One.

In 1986 the theatre was re-wired and in 1987 it closed for three months whilst the main auditorium was restored to its Edwardian splendour. Some areas of seating were reupholstered, lighting upgraded and a new carpet with the theatre's own logo laid in the foyer. This was rather appropriate, for in October 1987 the theatre celebrated its 75th birthday. On 21 October 1992 the theatre celebrated its 80th birthday with a play specially commissioned. It was written by Michael Wilcox who spent his childhood in Westcliff. The incidental music was provided by Barrington Pheloung, a local composer.

=== Palace Theatre Repertory Company ===
In March 1999 the theatre closed again, but after only a short period of time Green & Lenagan were retained to operate and programme the theatre on behalf of the Trust, for a period of five years. Roy Marsden was appointed as artistic director of the Palace Theatre Repertory Company and directed at least 5 in-house productions a year. In addition there was a lively mix of visiting companies, local amateur societies, one nighters and Sunday concerts. As before the theatre often hosted local bands on Sunday nights, and with free entry the foyer was often full to capacity.

The New Palace Theatre Company (Green & Lenagan) presented the first ever Agatha Christie Theatre Festival it run from 8 May to 28 July 2001. The festival, featured all of Christie's 25 plays, including a semi-staged performance of the West End production of The Mousetrap using all of the actors of the West End cast of the 'World's Longest Running Play.' This was the first time The Mousetrap has been licensed in the UK outside of the West End since it launched in 1952. 25 actors for the 135 performances of all 25 of Agatha Christie's plays in a 12-week season to mark the 25th anniversary of the mystery writer's death. It is believed that the Palace Theatre holds the world record for performing Agatha Christie.

The Dixon Studio complements the Main House with a wide range of performances by visiting small-scale touring theatre, dance and puppet companies. It also is used for some of the in-house productions and for workshops, talks, classes and educational work.

=== Renovation and Southend Theatres ===
On Saturday 29 June 2002 the Palace Theatre once again closed its doors to the public with its final performance by the British Touring Shakespeare Company with a modern and contemporary Production of Henry V. After only a short period, West End producers Green & Lenagan left the theatre without explanation, though there were many rumours in the local newspapers.

After 9 months, The Palace Theatre was once again open, this time after important renovation work was carried out backstage to the sound and lighting equipment and the general fabric of the building.

The theatre re-opened on 1 April 2003 under newly formed Southend Theatres, formed by merging Southend's Cliffs Pavilion and The Palace Theatre. The Palace will no longer be a repertory theatre. The new format for The Palace is one of receiving smaller scale national tours, big name major productions and intimate one-night shows featuring prominent performers.
