= Venturethree =

British branding company

venturethree
- Type: Independent
- Industry: Brand company
- Founded: August 11, 1999; 27 years ago
- Headquarters: London, UK
- Area served: Worldwide
- Key people: Philip Orwell (Founding Partner); Michael Zur-Szpiro (Non-executive); Graham Jones (Partner); Regine Stefan-Aboud (Partner); Bella Loynes (Partner); Jason Lowings (Partner); Tim Jones (Partner); Liam Hamill (Partner)
- Services: Brand strategy; Brand expression; Brand experience
- Number of employees: 50
- Website: www.venturethree.com

venturethree is an independent brand company based in London, specialising in brand strategy, brand expression and brand experience.

== History ==
venturethree was founded in London, in 1999 by Philip Orwell and Michael Zur-Szpiro. Before founding venturethree, Philip Orwell was a director at Wolff Olins. Michael Zur-Szpiro was the founder of Aroma Café, a chain of coffee shops, which was sold to McDonald's in 1999. Before that, Michael worked at Wolff Olins and Boston Consulting Group.

In January 2013 the company moved to a new studio, designed by Ab Rogers Design, in the former Royal Military Asylum at the Duke of York's Headquarters in Chelsea, now known as Cavalry Square.

In 2024 the company launched venturethree USA, Inc in New York to expand its presence across the Americas.

== Work ==
venturethree works in many sectors including media, technology, retail, energy, corporate, culture and non-profit.

== See also ==
- Saffron Brand Consultants
