= Ten-17 =

Former local radio station in Harlow, England

- Harlow; England
- Broadcast area: Harlow, East Herts and West Essex
- Frequency: 101.7 MHz
- RDS: _ten-17_F

Programming
- Format: CHR/Pop

Ownership
- Owner: Global Radio

History
- First air date: 1 May 1993
- Last air date: 25 July 2010

Ten 17 was an Independent Local Radio station, broadcast from studios at the Latton Bush Centre in Harlow. The station launched in May 1993 and served Harlow, East Herts and West Essex until its closure on 25 July 2010.

== History ==
Ten 17 came into existence following long campaigning work by a voluntary group, Harlow Community Radio Association (HCRA), which had the goal of launching a community radio station for the Harlow area. HCRA was led by four former Harlow Hospital Radio officers: Russ Lewell (chairman), Alan Hall (Secretary), Tony Saxby (Treasurer) and Tony Poole (Station Manager), who formed Harlow Radio Ltd as the legal entity for the group.

HCRA and Harlow Radio Ltd had well over 100 volunteers, community groups and local businesses interested in radio, or with a community orientation, and supportive of a radio station specifically for Harlow. Indeed, the HCRA team were successful in obtaining a £36,000 grant from Harlow Council to build a suite of studios and office space at its Latton Bush Centre.

Due to the success of the group, which gained widespread support from the local community, the Radio Authority (the regulator at the time) was sufficiently impressed by the Group's work and offer that they decided to advertise Harlow as one of the first licences for its new small scale commercial radio licences. Indeed, when the advertisement of the operating licence was announced, Harlow Radio Ltd was the only applicant group and it was widely assumed that they would be successful in being granted the licence.

However, the Radio Authority suspended the licence grant having reservations about the level of financial backing for the community group. HCRA therefore entered discussions with Essex Radio Group to agree terms to jointly run the radio station. Essex Radio Group Chairman, Eric Moonman, and Managing Director, Phil Hinton, took a personal interest in the cooperation, and a Station Director from Essex Radio, Peter Kerridge, was appointed to lead the development and launch what then became Ten 17. Essex Radio formed a new legal entity, Harlow FM Ltd, and Russ Lewell and Alan Hall from the original HCRA group became directors of the re-formed company, along with Eric Moonman, Phil Hinton and Mick Garrett (Essex Radio Finance Director). Although Essex Radio was the major shareholder, members of the HCRA were also given the opportunity to purchase shares, which many did.

Ten 17 launched on 1 May 1993. The first presenters were taken from the group of HCRA volunteers and trained by the Essex Radio Team. Russ Lewell was the first presenter to speak on Ten 17, introducing the first song - The Best, by Tina Turner - and other voluntary presenters at the time of launch included Tony Saxby, Ian Daborn, Lee Canderton, Graham Hindley and Vic James. Steve Sampson and Steve Saunders presented the popular Megasport programme on Saturday afternoons, featuring local and national sports news and music, supported by a team of dedicated volunteers.

Alan Hall developed a Training Programme for Features Presenters, to produce short, punchy three minute features. Alan also produced four series of features himself, each following the work of local services - including “On The Beat” (following the work of Harlow Police), “Harlow Ambulance”, “Harlow Green Watch” (Fire and Rescue Service) and “London Stansted”.

Other Features Presenters included Liz Good, Phil Dale and James Cassidy.

There were only two paid members of the presenting team on launch - Tony Williams (Presenter of the Drivetime Show) and Matt Precey (Journalist / News Presenter). The rest of the output was provided by a combination of shows presented by trained volunteers and content fed from Essex Radio, with local news interjected.

A few months after launch, though, Ten 17 introduced its own breakfast programme, presented by former volunteers Vic James and, latterly, Gary Mulligan.

The technical team was headed locally by Zulqar Cheema and the Station Receptionist was Judy Crosby - who went on to marry Ten 17 Director and Features Presenter, Alan Hall.

Many volunteers who presented programmes on Ten 17 have gone on to have successful careers in broadcasting and the media, including Simon Burrell (Simon James) and James Burrell (James Hill), Scott Hughes, Chris Badcock, Gavin Inskip, David Francis, Debbie (Mac) Mackintosh (now Johnson), Dave Wartnaby, Gary Mulligan and Wyatt Wendels (Planet Rock)..

On Peter's departure from Ten 17, Russ Lewell, one of the original founders and presenter, became Station Director.

== Rebrand and Closure ==
=== Rebranding ===
1999 - DMG Radio Ltd

Logo used by Ten 17 during its GWR days. This was replaced in 2007 by a new logo.

In 1999, Ten 17 FM was rebranded as Mercury FM, as were 5 of the 6 stations owned by DMG Radio Ltd. This station was known as Mercury 101.7. It was then changed back to Ten 17 when it was bought by GWR.

=== The 2000s onwards - GWR, GCap, and Global ===
Ten 17's owners, GWR, later merged with Capital Radio to become GCap. The station was retained. GCap was then bought by Global Radio in 2008. Up until July 2010, the station formed part of Global's The Hit Music Network, broadcasting a mix of locally produced output from Harlow and networked programming from Nottingham.

=== Closure ===
On 21 June 2010, Global Radio announced plans to rebrand Ten 17 as Heart and merge the station with Heart Essex and Heart Colchester as part of restructuring plans for the Heart Network.

The new station, Heart Essex, launched on Monday 26 July 2010 and broadcasts from studios in Chelmsford. The very last programme from Ten 17 was broadcast on Sunday 25 July 2010.
