= JJB Sports =

British sports retailer company

JJB Sports plc
- Final logo, used from 2007 to 2012.
- Type: Subsidiary
- Industry: Retail
- Founded: 1971
- Founder: JJ Broughton
- Defunct: 1 October 2012
- Fate: Bankruptcy
- Headquarters: Pemberton, near Wigan, Greater Manchester, England
- Key people: David Williams (CEO & CFO); Keith Jones (Chairman)
- Products: Clothing, sportswear, sports equipment
- Revenue: £284.2 million (2011)
- Operating income: £(103.5) million
- Net income: £(101.1) million
- Website: jjbsports.com (Now redirects to www.sportsdirect.com)

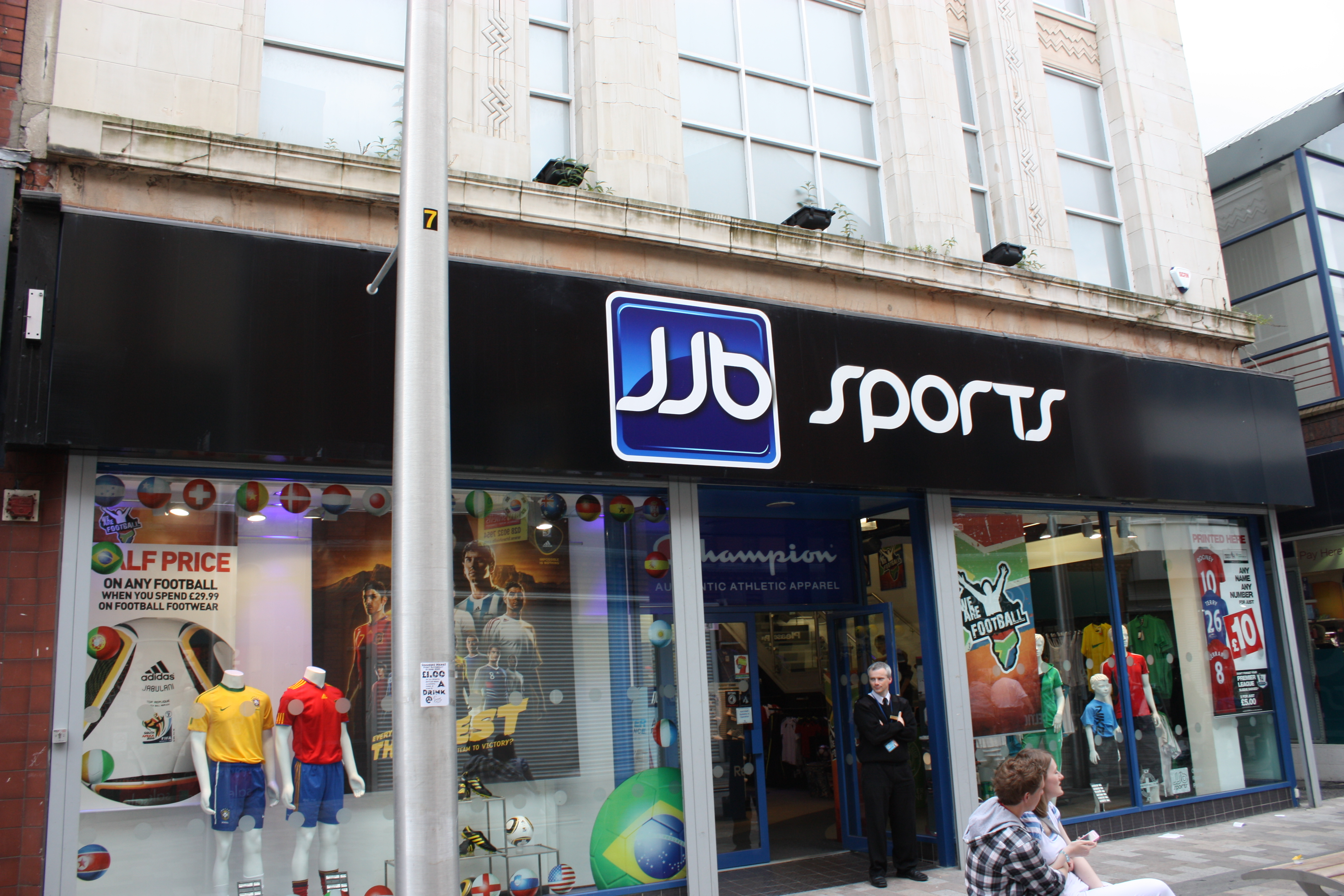
A JJB Sports store in Belfast, Northern Ireland, in 2010. This is now a CeX store.

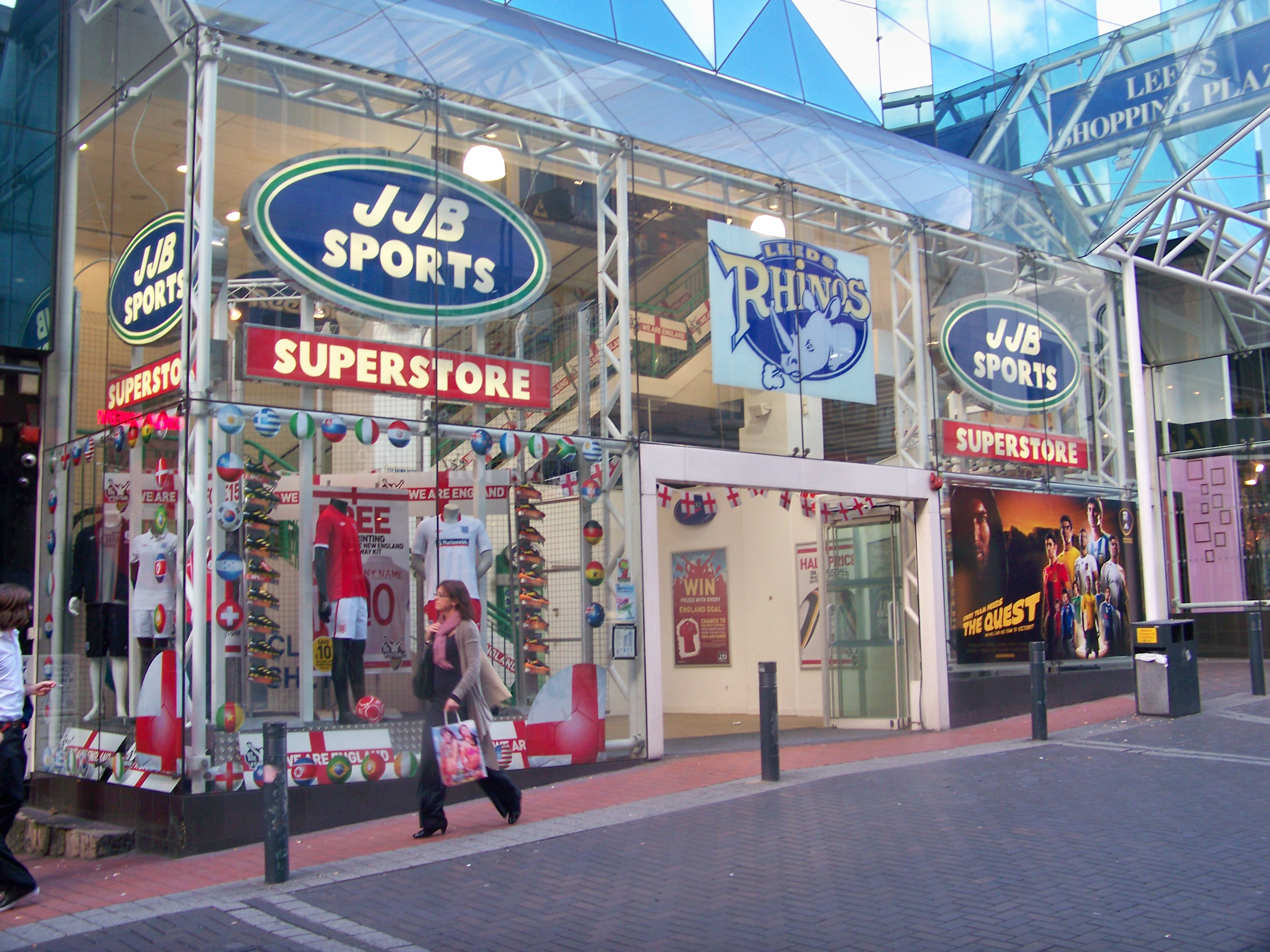
A JJB Sports Superstore in the Leeds Shopping Plaza, Leeds, West Yorkshire, in 2010.

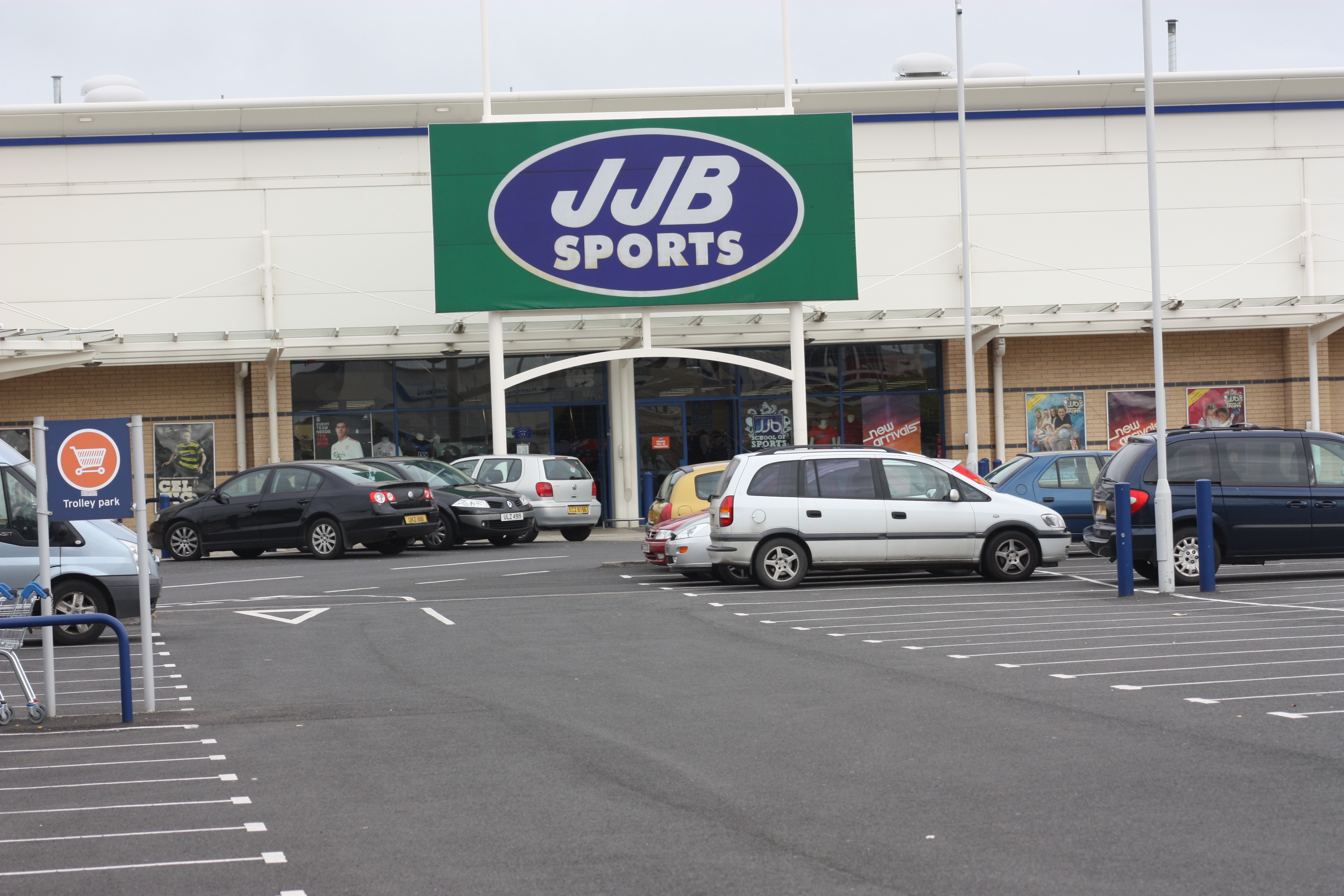
A JJB Sports store in Rushmere Retail Park, Craigavon, Northern Ireland, in 2009. This is now a B&M store.

JJB Sports plc was a British sports retailer. On 24 September 2012, shares in JJB Sports were suspended, and the firm called in administrators. On 1 October 2012, it was announced that Sports Direct had purchased part of the business, including 20 stores, the brand, and its website for £28.3 million.

== Corporate history ==
The original JJB sportshop was founded in the beginning of the 1900s. It was expanded and incorporated in 1971, when ex footballer and supermarket chain operator Dave Whelan acquired a single sports shop in Wigan, and immediately opened a second sports goods outlet in his supermarket in Sutton, St Helens.

The original JJB sports store was established by John Jarvis Broughton in the beginning of the 1900s, and later was purchased by John Bradburn in 1948. As the business was known locally as JJB's, Bradburn retained the name, as did Whelan when he bought the shop from Bradburn.

During the beginning of the 1990s, the store portfolio grew to stores totalling 120 by 1994, at which point the company was floated on the London Stock Exchange. In July 1998, JJB bought its largest domestic competitor Sports Division. The acquisition made JJB one of the largest sports retailers in the United Kingdom, focusing on sports clothing rather than sports equipment. JJB had got to a sales total of £372.97 million (US$636.60 million) in 1999.

In July 2002, it had also opened a new branch in Amsterdam. In October 2002, Duncan Sharpe, chief executive of JJB Sports, committed suicide. Mr Sharpe had been with the company for nineteen years, and was the son in law of the chairman, Dave Whelan.

By 2005, JJB had expanded to stores over 430 throughout the United Kingdom and Ireland. On 8 June 2007, Mr Whelan sold his residual 29% stake in the firm for £190 million to Icelandic financial group Exista and Chris Ronnie, a sports retailer who previously worked at Umbro and Sports Direct.

On 19 October 2007, JJB bought a stake of 10.1% in Umbro, in an move to protect its stake in the market for shirts of England Football. This stake was sold in its entirety to Nike in March 2008.

In December 2007, JJB announced that they had purchased the Original Shoe Company for £5 million. JJB considered converting some of the smaller JJB High Street stores into OSC stores, keeping OSC as a separate division of the JJB group which would share JJB's buying, financing and marketing functions.

In September 2008, JJB released a less than impressive set of interim results, which included a warning from the auditors raising doubts over JJB's future as a going concern. In October 2008, the value of JJB shares fell to less than 10% of the value, at the time of Dave Whelan's share sale to Chris Ronnie and Exista. This was partly in response to the interim financial report, and also as a result of Coface removing credit insurance.

This was from debts owed by JJB to their suppliers. Three weeks later, a 34% share was purchased by Sports Direct.

On 10 February 2009, JJB put their Qube and Original Shoe Company subsidiaries into administration, after failing to find a buyer. By the end of the week, the group secured a reprieve from its bankers to avoid putting the whole group into administration. On 13 October 2009, JJB admitted that former executives were being investigated by both HM Revenue & Customs and the Serious Organised Crime Agency.

=== 2011: Major Restructuring Plan ===
JJB was one of many companies that had undergone major restructuring and change due to the recession and faced a £31.5 million debt, the closure of 95 stores and a possible hostile takeover by one of its top rivals, JD Sports, as of February 2011. The firm attempted to raise £65 million in finances from its investors on 7 April 2011.

In February 2011, JJB revealed that as many as 95 of its stores faced closure within the next two years, and had asked for emergency £31.5m funding on 11 December 2011.

=== Administration ===
The combined market value of JJB Sports' shares had totaled £500 million in 2010, but had unpredictably collapsed to only £1.2 million by September 2012.

On 24 September 2012, it was reported by the BBC that shares in JJB Sports had been suspended, and that the firm was calling in the administrators. It was expected that many of the firm’s 180 stores would close, and most of the company's 4,000 employees would be made redundant. It was reported that the Bill & Melinda Gates Foundation was to lose millions of dollars from this outcome, following its investment in JJB Sports in 2009.

On 1 October 2012, it was announced that rival retailer Sports Direct had purchased the 'JJB' brand name, website and 20 stores, saving around 550 jobs. However, the remaining 160 stores were to close, resulting in 2,200 redundancies. JJB Sports was officially dissolved, with debts of £150 million on 9 November 2012. There were a total of 5,000 employees at its closure.

As of 2025, JD Sports owns the JJB brand name and trademarks, Frasers Group still owns the website domain.

=== Legal issues ===
On 13 October 2009, JJB admitted that former executives were being investigated by both HM Revenue & Customs and the Serious Organised Crime Agency.

The former boss of both Next and JJB Sports, Sir David Jones, was charged in February 2013, over allegations of forgery and making misleading statements to the market while he was executive chairman of JJB Sports, concerning an earlier £150 million loan. Jones helped to turn the clothes retailer Next into one of Britain's largest retailers.

== Brands ==
In an effort to distance themselves from the majority "own branded" offering of main competitor Sports Direct, JJB's stock package mainly comprised products from the main sportswear suppliers, such as Nike, Adidas, Puma, and Reebok. However, JJB did operate its own brands, including 'Patrick' (menswear and football accessories), and 'Olympus' (womenswear and fitness accessories).

== Marketing ==
JJB Sports launched their shopping site, JJB Sports Store, with a view to expanding their market. The majority shareholder of JJB Sports Plc was Dave Whelan, but his 99% stake was sold off. JJB no longer operated the famous "Soccerdomes", nor any gyms or Fitness Clubs outside Ireland. Also, because of Dave Whelan's purchase of the Fitness Club, and founding of DW Sports Fitness in September 2009, JJB has lost its association with Wigan Athletic FC and Wigan Warriors RLFC.

The stadium previously sponsored by the company has since been renamed the DW Sports Stadium, later the Brick Community Stadium.

On 7 September 2011, JJB Sports launched a new major marketing campaign entitled "Ready?". The campaign involves prime time television advertising, national press coverage, in store promotions, and online competitions. The Ready campaign was JJB Sport's first appearance on television for over four years, and represented the company's desire to become profitable again.

== Price fixing ==
In May 2005, JJB Sports were fined £8.3 million, by the Office of Fair Trading (OFT), for fixing the price of England and Manchester United shirts in 2000 and 2001. Which? consumer magazine issued proceedings against JJB Sports to sue the high street retailer for damages on behalf of consumers who were affected by the price fixing.

== Fitness clubs ==
The business operated approximately sixty health & fitness centres all over the United Kingdom, which became property of DW Sports Fitness after Dave Whelan's departure from JJB.

JJB also ran health and fitness centres in the Republic of Ireland, which are now operated by Sports Direct, following the liquidation of the company.

== Sponsorships ==
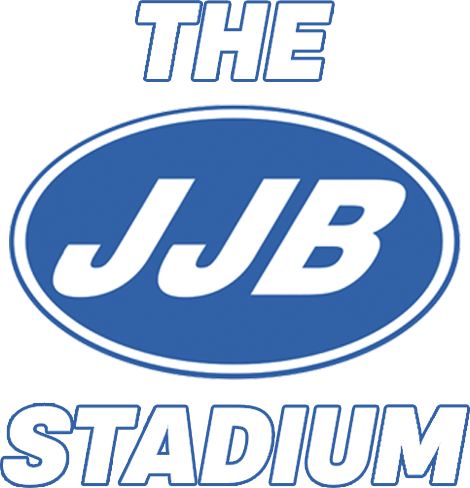
The JJB Stadium logo (1999–2009)

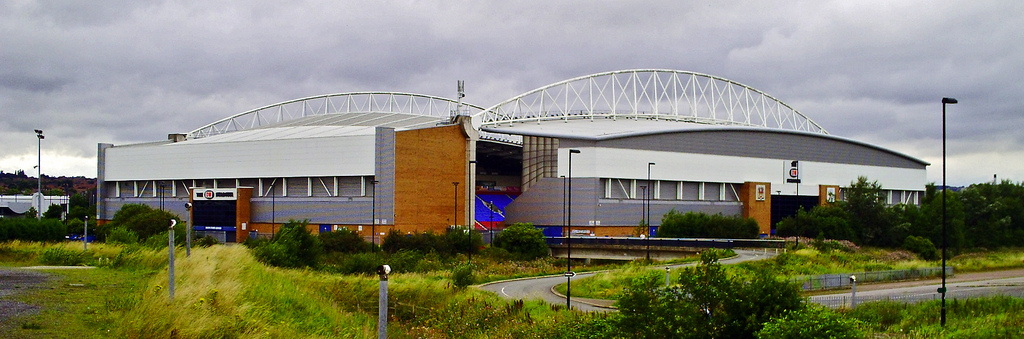
A view of the DW Stadium, from the bridge crossing the Leeds and Liverpool Canal

JJB Sports provided naming rights for the now Brick Community Stadium, a football and rugby league stadium in Wigan. Wigan Athletic and Wigan Warriors have played their home games at the stadium since 1999.

Other sponsorships include:

- Irish Cup (JJB Sports Irish Cup)
- Oceânico Group Pro-Am Challenge (JJB Sports North West Challenge)
- PowerLeague SoccerDome (JJB Sports SoccerDome)
- Super League (JJB Sports Super League)
