= Sports Direct =

British retail company

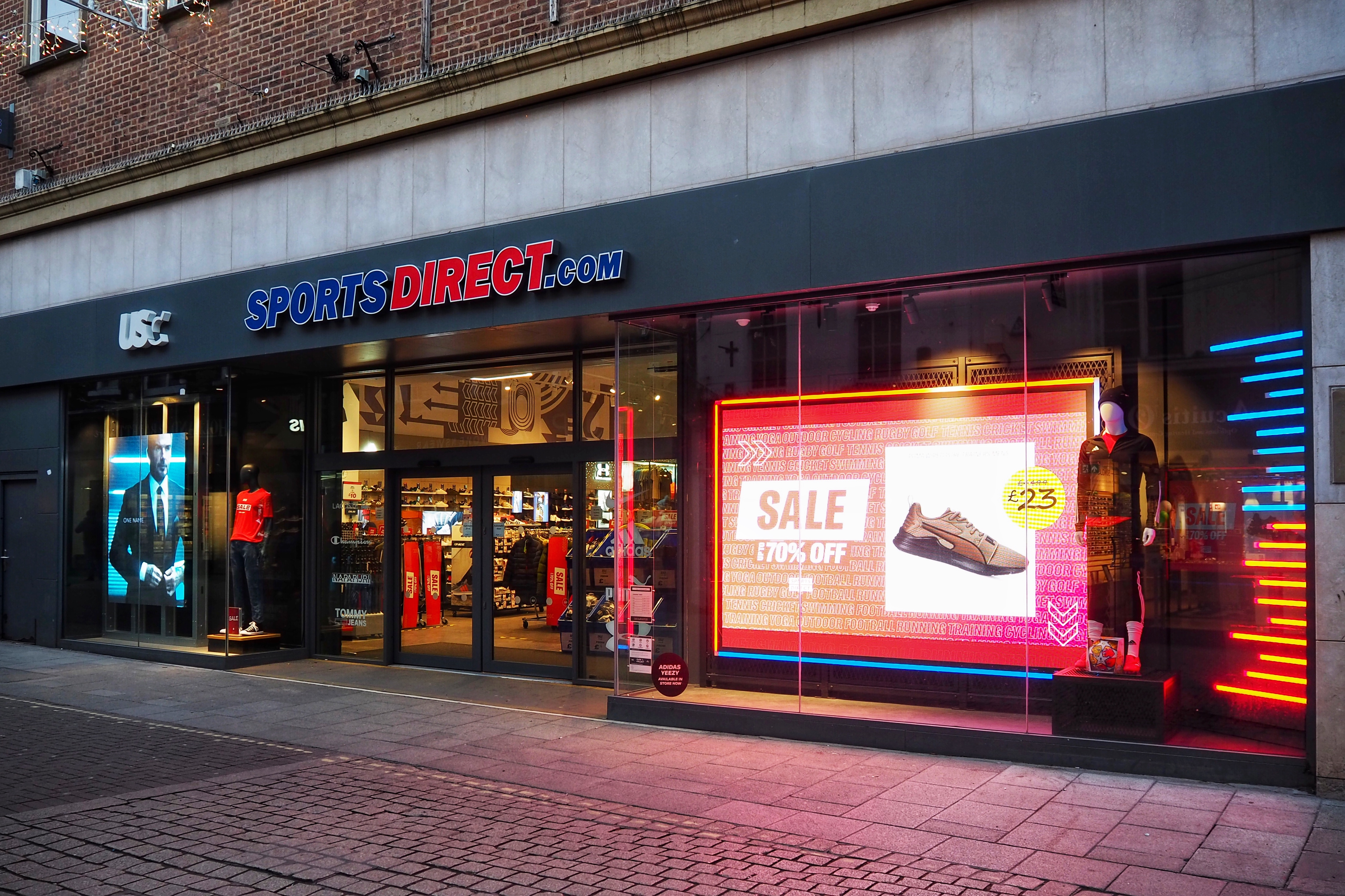
- Sports Direct store, York
- Formerly: Mike Ashley Sports (1982–1997); Sports Soccer (1997–2003); Sports World (2003–2008 UK)
- Type: Private
- Industry: Retail
- Founded: 1982; 44 years ago
- Founder: Mike Ashley
- Headquarters: Shirebrook, England
- Number of locations: 715 stores (2024)
- Area served: Stores: Australia Austria Belgium Bulgaria Cyprus Czech Republic Denmark Estonia Finland France Hungary Iceland Indonesia Ireland Latvia Lithuania Luxembourg Malaysia Malta Netherlands Poland Portugal Romania Slovakia Slovenia Spain United Kingdom; Online only: Croatia Germany Greece Italy Moldova Netherlands New Zealand Singapore United States
- Key people: Lauren Barrie (Chief Retail Officer); Dan Banks (Head of Sports Retail UK)
- Products: Clothing; Footwear; Sportswear; Accessories
- Owner: Frasers Group
- Number of employees: approx. 20,000 (2024)
- Parent: Frasers Group Trading Limited
- Divisions: Lillywhites; Game
- Website: SportsDirect SportsWorld

Sports Direct is a British retail company owned by Frasers Group. The company was founded in 1982 by Mike Ashley and was originally based in Maidenhead, England. It specialises in the sale of sports equipment, clothing, footwear, and accessories, operating both physical outlets and an online store.

The company operates internationally across Europe, as well as in Australia, Malaysia, New Zealand, Singapore, and the United States. Some Frasers Group fascias, such as USC, Game, and Evans Cycles, also operate within selected Sports Direct stores. In recent years, Sports Direct stores have been incorporated into new Frasers outlets.

== History ==
In 1982, businessman Mike Ashley started Mike Ashley Sports from a single store in Maidenhead, Berkshire. By the mid-1990s, Mike Ashley Sports had expanded to 12 stores.

In June 1997, the business was renamed to Sports Soccer. By the end of the 1990s, Sports Soccer had grown into a portfolio of around 100 stores.

In September 2003, the business was renamed again to Sports World.

In February 2006, Sports World purchased Gilesports and merged it into its store portfolio.

In April 2008, the business was renamed again to Sports Direct.

In October 2012, Sports Direct International acquired 20 former JJB Sports stores and converted them into Sports Direct stores.

In June 2015, Sports Direct appeared in an episode of Channel 4's Dispatches where they investigated and went under-cover in the Sports Direct warehouse in Shirebrook as it was alleged it was like "sweatshop" and compared working conditions to the victorian era.

It was announced in 2018 that Game concession stores would open in Sports Direct stores.

In November 2019, Sports Direct International rebranded to Frasers Group as part of their "elevation" strategy as House of Fraser became their second flagship brand alongside Sports Direct.

In March 2020, Sports Direct announced they would remain open amid the coronavirus lockdown in the UK. A day later, after receiving widespread criticism, the decision was reversed.

Former company logo

In March 2021, Sports Direct underwent a rebrand aimed at "promoting inclusivity" and "enhancing customer experience". The rebrand, designed by the consultancy Venturethree, included a new logo and visual identity. The logo was redesigned to feature an 'equaliser' symbol, representing "inclusivity and equality".

In February 2025, Sports Direct launched their own membership scheme as the "Sports Direct Membership" allowing customers to earn points and access a range of benefits from the scheme. The scheme was discontinued nearly a year later in January 2026, being merged into Frasers Plus.

== Operations ==
Sports Direct has around 700 stores across the UK and several other European countries. The company expanded into the European Union in the mid-2000s, and by 2024, it had a presence in countries including France, Greece, Spain, and the Netherlands. In Denmark, SportsMaster operates under the Sports World brand, which it acquired in 2022.

SportsWorld logo

Sports Direct continues to use its Sports World branding in some markets. As of 2024, there were approximately 170 Sports Direct stores operating within the European Union, primarily focusing on sporting goods and apparel. In Asia, Sports Direct expanded its operations into Malaysia, where it operates several stores under the SportsDirect and Sports World brands. Sports Direct entered the Indonesian market in 2024 in partnership with Mitra Adiperkasa; most outlets are located inside Sogo department stores that are operated by Mitra Adiperkasa.

In 2021, Sports Direct collaborated with the design agency Venturethree to develop a new brand strategy and identity. The rebrand introduced a new logo featuring an equal sign, symbolising equality and inclusivity, and emphasised accessibility in sports. As part of this strategy, the company refurbished several flagship stores. Its Oxford Street flagship store in London underwent a £10 million revamp, incorporating digital technologies such as interactive displays.

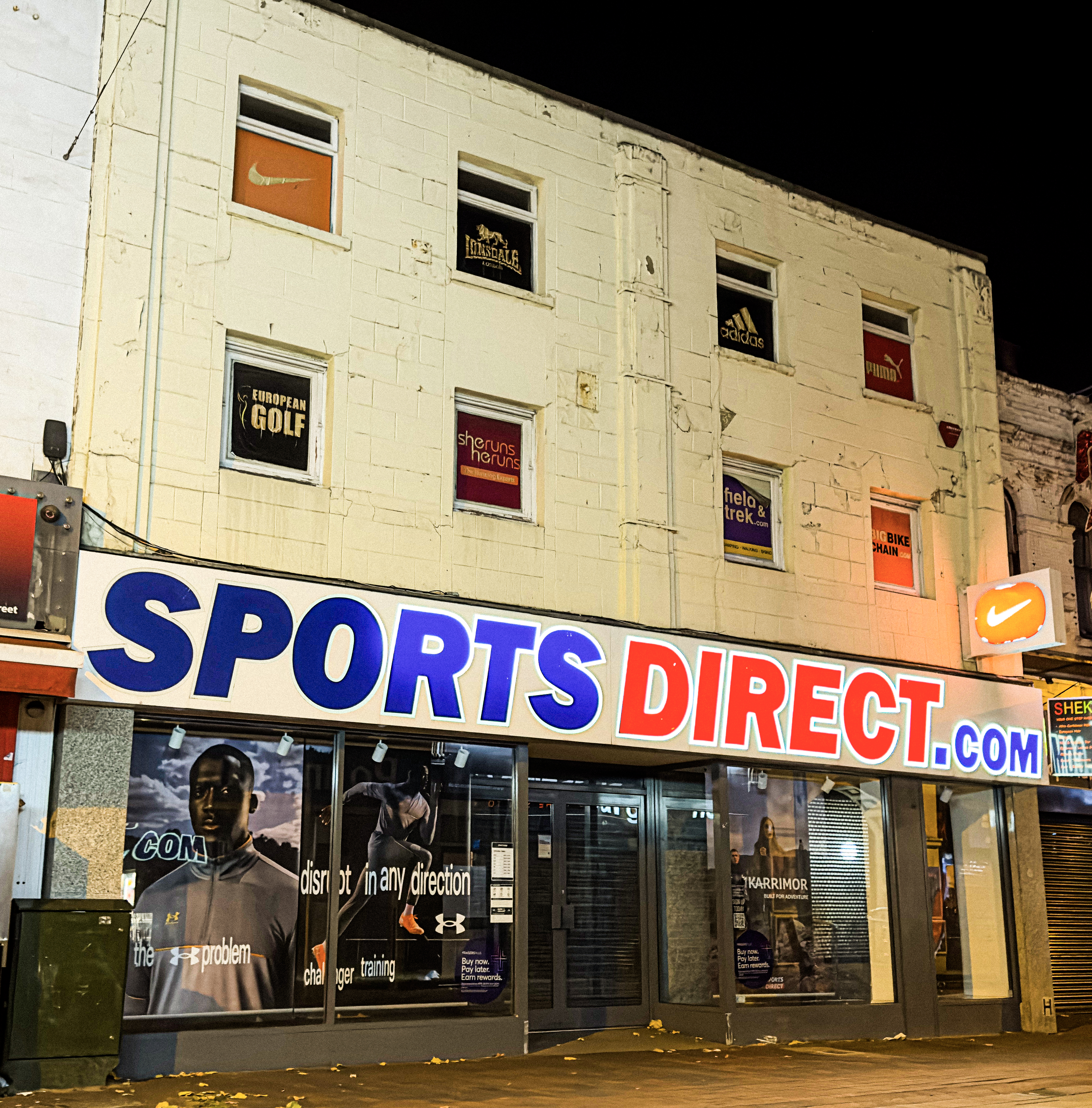
A Sports Direct store on High Street, Chatham, Kent, England

The elevation strategy also involved expanding into "premium" and "lifestyle" segments. Sports Direct opened new flagship stores in Manchester and Cardiff, featuring areas for high-end brands and specialised sporting categories. For example, the Cardiff flagship introduced an "Outdoor Concept", with products tailored to outdoor enthusiasts.

In 2021, Sports Direct's parent company, Frasers Group, began integrating Sports Direct stores with other brands under its portfolio, such as USC, GAME and Evans Cycles. This consolidation aimed to provide a "more comprehensive retail experience" and streamline operations.

The elevation strategy has led to the closure of some smaller stores, particularly those under 20,000 square feet, to focus on larger flagship locations.

In February 2025, parent company Frasers Group announced a 10-year partnership with distributor GMG to open 50 Sports Direct stores in the Middle East and North Africa.

In August 2025, Sports Direct opened its first store in Malta in a partnership with Hudson Group.

In April 2025, it was announced that stores would open across Australia and New Zealand in a partnership with Accent Group. The first Australian store opened in November 2025.

Sports Direct's promotional mugs, described by the Daily Mirror as "ubiquitous" in British kitchens, are noted for their £1 price and large (570ml) capacity. The mug has been the subject of several memes and featured in the music video to It Ain't Safe by Skepta.

== Sponsorships ==
=== Newcastle United ===
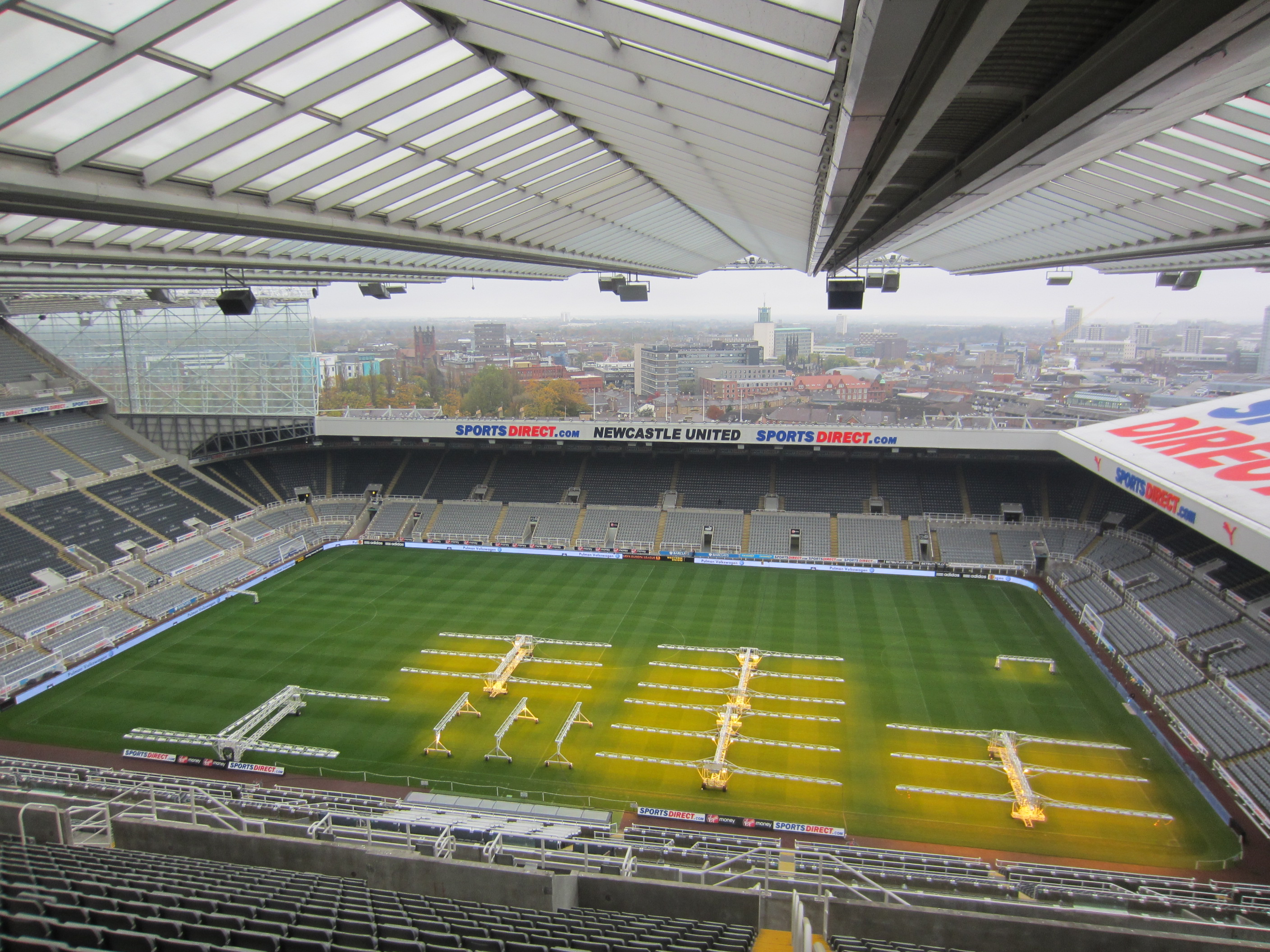
St James' Park with Sportsdirect.com branding

Sports Direct served as Newcastle United's primary sponsor, with the company's branding featured on club shirts. On 10 November 2011, Newcastle United announced that their stadium would temporarily be renamed the "Sports Direct Arena". The decision to drop the St James' Park name was made on the grounds that the original name was not deemed "commercially attractive". Previously, in 2009, the club had expressed intentions to sell the stadium naming rights. However, following protests, including an early-day motion in Parliament, the club clarified that the St James' Park name would not be entirely abandoned, and alternatives such as "Sportsdirect.com @ St James' Park Stadium" were considered.

In 2012, the club entered into a sponsorship agreement with payday loan company Wonga.com, which included purchasing the stadium naming rights. This deal saw the return of the St James' Park name, which was restored as part of the agreement.

Following the 2021 Saudi-led takeover of Newcastle United, the new ownership, led by Amanda Staveley and her consortium, removed all Sports Direct branding from the stadium. The removal of the branding, which occurred on 6 December 2021, marked a break from the previous ownership's commercial ties. Mike Ashley, the former owner, subsequently filed legal action against Staveley and her husband, Mehrdad Ghodoussi, after claiming they had breached an agreement to maintain the Sports Direct sponsorship until the end of the 2021–22 season.

As of the 2024–25 season, the "Newcastle United" signage above the East Stand (which used the typeface used by Sports Direct) was restored to its original font.

=== Hibernian ===
In August 2022, Sports Direct became the shirt sponsor for the Hibernian F.C. women's team, with Sports Direct advertising on both the home and away kit.

=== Gaelic games and association football in Ireland ===
==== Gaelic games ====
In December 2020, Sports Direct entered into a five-year sponsorship agreement with Cork GAA, becoming the official sponsor of the men's senior hurling and football teams, as well as the U20 and minor teams in both codes. This partnership commenced in early 2021.

In August 2021, Sports Direct became the official sponsor of the Ladies Gaelic Football Association's 'Gaelic4Mothers&Others' programme.

In December 2023, Sports Direct announced a two-year partnership with Louth GAA, becoming the official partner of the men's senior, U20, and U17 teams in both football and hurling.

==== Football Association of Ireland (FAI) ====
In 2023, Sports Direct became the title sponsor of the Football Association of Ireland's (FAI) Men's and Women's FAI Cups. In the same year it also entered a sponsorship agreement with the FAI to become the official retail partner for the Republic of Ireland national football team.

==== Northern Ireland Football League (NIFL) ====
In 2023, the company entered into a three-year partnership with the Northern Ireland Football League (NIFL), becoming the title sponsor of the Men's and Women's Premierships.

=== Hyrox ===
In 2024, Sports Direct became title partner of Hyrox, a global fitness competition that combines running with functional fitness.
