= USC (clothing retailer) =

Clothing retailer that sells branded clothing across the United Kingdom

Republic.com Retail Ltd
- Type: Private
- Industry: Retail
- Founded: 1989; 37 years ago in Edinburgh, Scotland
- Founder: Alfred Brown
- Headquarters: Shirebrook, United Kingdom
- Products: Clothing
- Revenue: 70,000,000 pound sterling (2011)
- Parent: Frasers Group
- Website: usc.co.uk

Republic.com Retail Ltd (trading as USC) is a British clothing retailer. The company was founded in 1989 in Edinburgh, and has been owned by Frasers Group since July 2011.

In 2026, the remaining standalone USC stores were closed, with USC appearing as a concession brand within the Sports Direct chain instead, operating across the UK and internationally.

== History ==
The first USC store opened in 1989 in Edinburgh and specialised in sports clothing. USC originally stood for 'United Sports Corporation' and was founded by Angus Morrison and David Douglas.

In 2004, USC was purchased for £43 million by Sir Tom Hunter.

The company entered into administration on 29 December 2008, and 15 stores were closed. The remaining 43 stores were bought in a pre-packaged deal by Dundonald Holdings Ltd, also owned by Sir Tom Hunter.

In July 2011, Tom Hunter sold 80% of USC to Mike Ashley's Sports Direct chain. In early 2012, Sports Direct bought the remaining 20%. USC's Head Office was moved to Shirebrook to merge in with its Sports Direct Head Office.

Sports Direct purchased Republic out of administration in 2013 and merged the business with USC.

=== 2015 administration and restructuring ===
On 8 January 2015, City A.M. reported that Mike Ashley was preparing to place USC into administration, after filing a notice of the intention to appoint receivers at the high court on Wednesday 7 January 2015. It was further reported in City A.M. that Duff & Phelps would act as the administrators. On the morning of Wednesday 7 January 2015, dozens of staff at the USC warehouse in Dundonald Ayrshire were given their notice of redundancy when trucks from Sports Direct arrived at the warehouse to take goods to Shirebrook, Nottingham. By the following Wednesday, 14 January 2015, the Dundonald warehouse had been emptied of all stock and the doors were finally closed. Remaining warehouse staff were sent home.

In the two preceding months leases for many of USC's stores were transferred to Republic, and the USC trademark was transferred to another Sports Direct company. In October 2015 the chief executive of Sports Direct, David Forsey, was charged with a criminal offence for consultation failures over USC staff who only had 15 minutes notice of redundancy.

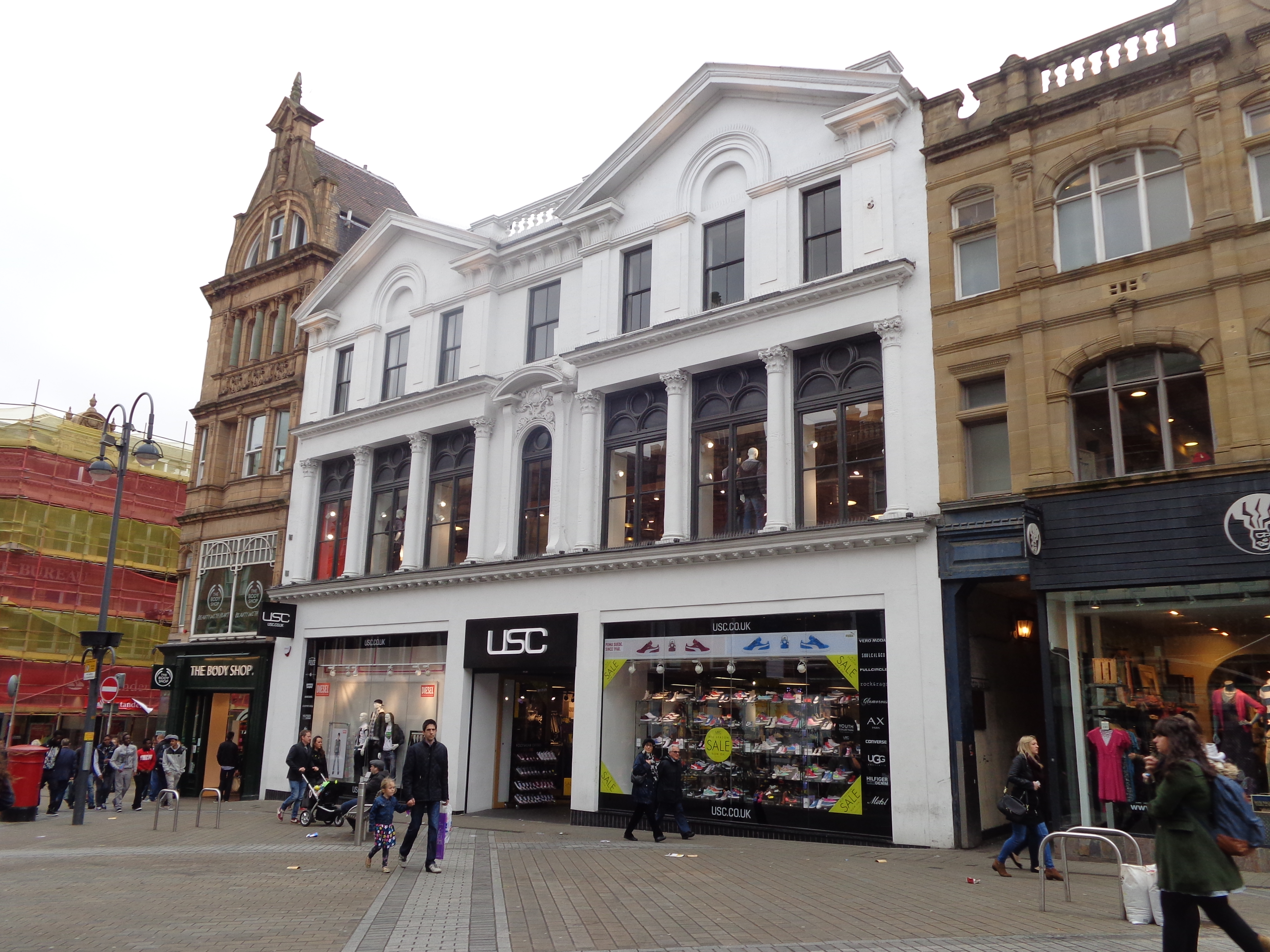
USC, Briggate, Leeds (2014).

On 16 January 2015 USC was bought out of administration by another Sports Direct holding company, Republic Retail Limited. Although controversial as a pre-packed administration this move allowed the existing stores and remaining staff to continue to trade. Sports Direct received criticism by MPs for refusing to pay suppliers such as Diesel and laying off staff with only fifteen minutes notice.

Prior to the administration USC had been trading at a loss and had issues with its trade credit insurance, meaning that suppliers were not covered for lost stock if the company had collapsed. The company owed money to Diesel who issued a winding up order to attempt to recoup the debt. Diesel had severed a fifteen-year relationship with USC the year before.

As of 25 February 2015 the administration process wiped £15.3 million worth of debt, leaving £15.2 million remaining owed to creditors. Of this amount USC owes £14.3 million to trade and expense creditors, £576,499 to HMRC and £286,333 in issued gift vouchers.

=== 2026 ===
By mid-2026, Frasers Group had consolidated all of the remaining UK standalone USC stores and placed them inside Sports Direct units as concessions. It implemented the same strategy for Game in the same year.
