= List of clothing and footwear shops in the United Kingdom =

This is a list of the current and defunct physical clothing and footwear shops in the United Kingdom. This includes shoes, clothing and sportswear, but not online retailers.

== Current ==
=== A–D ===
Clothing shops in UK	Image	Established in UK	Owned by	Number of shops	Type of shop	Notes
7 for All Mankind		2000	VF Corporation	5	American jeans company	Founded in Los Angeles by Michael Glasser, Peter Koral, and Jerome Dahan, the business was purchased by VF Corp. in 2007. The first UK shop opened in London in 2010.
Acne Studios		1997	Private company	2	Swedish designer brand	Founded by the Acne creative collective in Stockholm, the first UK shop opened in 2013.
Adidas		1949	Public company	18	German sports manufacturer	Founded by Adolf Dassler after he and his brother parted ways after WW2. Operates 18 shops including Adidas Originals, Outlets, Y3 and Stella, as well as six joint Adidas and Reebok outlets.
Agent Provocateur		1994	3i	13	Ladies' underwear	Founded in Soho by Joseph Corre (son of Vivienne Westwood) and his ex-wife Serena Rees. Purchased by 3i in 2007 for £60m.
Akris		1922	Private	1	Swiss designer brand for women	Founded by Alice Kriemler-Schoch in St. Gallen, Switzerland. Operates in London in Old Bond Street.
Aldo Group		1972	Private company		Footwear retailer	Founded in Montreal, Canada by Aldo Bensadoun as a footwear concession, the business expanded internationally and opened its first UK shop in 2002.
Charlie Allen		1984	Privately owned company	1	Men's tailors	Charlie Allen founded his tailoring shop in 1984.
AllSaints		1994	Lion Capital LLP		Men's and ladies' wear	Founded by Stuart Trevor and Kait Bolongaro from The Saint wholesale menswear business. The first shop opened in 1997.
American Apparel		1989	Public company	19	American manufacturer and retailer	Founded by Dov Charney, the American manufacturer moved into retail in 2003 opening its first UK shop in Carnaby Street, London in 2006.
American Eagle Outfitters		1977	Public company	3	American clothing shop	Founded by the Silverman family in 1977, the business opened its first UK shop in November 2014.
& Other Stories		2013	H & M	7	Swedish clothing brand	Upmarket clothing brand created by H & M, with the first UK shop opening in Regent Street, London in 2013.
Anderson & Sheppard		1906	Rowland family	2	Men's tailors	In 1906, Peter Gustav, also known as Per Anderson, founded Anderson & Sheppard at No. 30, Savile Row. Moved from Savile Row in 2004.
Richard Anderson		2001	Private company	1	Men's bespoke tailors	Founded by Richard Anderson & Brian Lishak, the business was the first bespoke tailoring house to open on Savile Row in 50 years.
Ann Summers		1970	Gold Family	144	Ladies' underwear	Founded in Marble Arch, London by Annice Summers as a sex shop. Purchased by Ralph & David Gold in 1971 and turned into a high street brand selling underwear.
Anthropologie		1992	Urban Outfitters	10	Womenswear	Founded in 1992 with its first shop opening in Wayne, Pennsylvania, US. The multigoods retailer opened its first shop in the UK in Regent Street in 2009.
Aquascutum		1851	YGM Trading	3	Men's clothing	Founded in Regent Street, London by John Emary.
Ark		1992	JD Sports	5	Fashion retailer	Founded as a ticket shop to ARK club nights in The Corn Exchange in Leeds, before moving into clothing. JD Sports purchased the business after it went into administration in 2013.
Armani		1975	Private company		Italian fashion house	Italian fashion house founded by Giorgio Armani, the business operates shops and concessions under several names – Emporio Armani / Armani Jeans / Gorgio Armani in the UK.
Asda		1949	Wal-Mart through subsidiary Corinth Services Ltd	577	Men's, children's and ladies' clothing and footwear	Founded as "ASDA Queens" from the merger of Associated Dairies and the Asquith family owned Queens Supermarket. George (named after designer George Davies) clothing was launched in 1989 replacing the Asdale and Asda ranges. Mintel estimate that George is the fourth largest retailer of clothing in the United Kingdom, after Marks & Spencer, the Arcadia Group and Next.
Laura Ashley		1953	MUI Group of Malaysia		Ladies' clothing	Founded by Laura & Bernard Ashley as Ashley Mountney in 1953 as manufacturer of headscarves, napkins, table mats and tea-towels. The first Laura Ashley shop opened in 1968.
Azagury		1987	Private company	1	British ladies' designer brand	Founded by Jacques Azagury, one of the creators of the New Romantic look.
Ted Baker		1988	Private company	42	Men's and ladies' fashion brand	Founded by Ray Kelvin in Glasgow as a menswear brand and retailer, and opened further shops in Manchester, Plymouth, and Nottingham. The Covent Garden shop opened in 1990 and in 1995 they started a Women's range. They now operate 42 standalone shops and various concessions across the UK.
Bally Shoe		1851	JAB Holdings	5	Shoe retailer	Carl Franz Bally founded his shoe making business in Switzerland in 1851.
Banana Republic		1978	Gap Inc.	8	American fashion retailer	Founded by Mel and Patricia Ziegler as a retailer with a safari theme, the business was purchased by GAP, who repositioned the retailer to a more upmarket position. The first UK shop opened in Regent Street, London in March 2008.
Jeff Banks		1969	Private company	16	British fashion designer brand	Jeff Banks started his own designer brand in 1969, opening his first shop in 1975.
Barbour		1894	Private company	30	Manufacturer and retailer of outdoor clothing	Founded by John Barbour as an importer of oil cloth, the business operates its own retail shops as well as supplies wholesale.
Basler		1936	Private company	6	German womenswear brand	Founded as Fritz Basler GmBH & Co. in Kreuzberg, Germany as a manufacturer of coats. In 1997 it opened its first boutique in Hamburg, Germany, and opened its first UK shop in London in 2007.
Beales		1881	Public limited company	29	Department store	Founded by John Elmes Beale in Bournemouth. The business expanded rapidly during the 2000s, purchasing former Bentalls and Co-operative department stores.
Bellville Sassoon		1953	David Sassoon	1	Ladies' clothing	Founded by Belinda Bellville in Knightsbridge, London. David Sassoon joined in 1958 and the name was changed in 1970 from "Bellville".
Belstaff		1924	Labelux Group	1	British designer brand	Founded by Eli Belovitch and his son-in-law Harry Grosberg in Staffordshire as a manufacturer of all-weather jackets for motorcyclists. In 2011 the business was purchased by Italian business Labelux, and in 2012 opened a shop in New Bond Street, London.
L.K.Bennett		1990	Private company	99	Ladies' clothing and footwear	Linda Kristin Bennett is an English-Icelandic clothing designer who set up the first L. K. Bennett shop in Wimbledon Village in 1990. Bennett sold a 70 per cent stake in the business in 2007 to Phoenix Equity Partners and Sirius Equity, a retail and branded luxury goods investment company.
Berghaus		1966	Pentland Group	7	Outdoor clothing brand and retailer	Founded by Peter Lockey and Gordon Davison as LD Mountain Centre in Newcastle upon Tyne. In 1972 they launched their own brand of clothing called Berghaus to sell in their shop. In 1993 Pentland Group purchased the business.
Berluti		1895	LVMH	2	Luxury menswear manufacturer and retailer	Founded by Alessandro Berluti in Paris, the business was purchased by LVMH in 1993.
Bershka		1998	Inditex Group	5	Fashion retailer	Fashion retailer founded by the owners of Zara, the business opened its first UK shop in the Metro Centre in 2004.
Blacks Outdoor Retail		1861	JD Sports Fashion plc		Outdoor clothing and footwear	Formerly Blacks of Greenock, originally a sail maker, then tent maker, the company became Blacks Camping during the 1980s before becoming Blacks Leisure in 1994. It purchased rival Millets in 1999. It went into a CVA in 2009, before going into administration in 2011 and being purchased by JD Sports Fashion plc.
Blue Inc		1912	Marlow Retail Limited	200	Men's and ladies' clothing	Founded as A. Levy & Sons in 1912. Traded under various names including Mr Byrite. Blue Inc name introduced in 2002. Purchased by Marlow Retail Ltd in 2006.
Ozwald Boateng		1995	Private limited company	1	Men's tailors	Ozwald Boateng opened his first boutique in Virgo Street, London in 1995. He moved to his current location No. 30 Savile Row in 2008.
Boden		1991	Private company	1	Men's, ladies' and children's clothing	Founded by Johnnie Boden in 1991, the business started out offering menswear products. It has since moved into women's and childrenswear selling primarily online in several countries. The business has one physical shop in Park Royal, London and plans to open further UK shops.
Bolongaro Trevor		2006	Private company	9	Men's and women's fashion brand	Founded by Kait Bolongaro and Stuart Trevor after they had sold their shares in AllSaints.
Bonmarché		1982	Sun European Partners	240	Ladies' clothing	Formed by Parkash Singh Chima after the merging of two clothing business – Wiltex and Hartley, with the first Bonmarché opening in 1985. Acquired by Peacocks in 2002. Sold in January 2012 to Sun European Partners.
Hugo Boss		1924	Public limited company		Men's and ladies' fashion	Founded by Hugo Boss as a clothing manufacturer in Stuttgart. The first UK shop opened in 1996 after Moss Brothers purchased the franchise. In April 2011 Moss Brother sold the franchise and its shop back to Hugo Boss.
Bottega Veneta		1966	Kering	1	Italian designer brand	Italian designer brand that opened its first UK shop in Sloane Street, London in 2002.
Boux Avenue		2011	Theo Paphitis	9	Lingerie retailer	Founded by Theo Paphitis, the name is inspired by a French waitress who served Paphitis when holidaying with his family in France. The retailer opened its first shop in Spring 2011.
Brandy Melville			Private company	2	American designer brand	American designer brand worn by celebrities Miley Cyrus, Ashley Benson, Karlie Kloss, Taylor Swift, Vanessa Hudgens, and several famous YouTubers.
Bravissimo		1995	Private limited company	21	Ladies' underwear	Formed by Sarah Tremellen and Hannah Griffiths as a mail order business in 1995. In 1999 they opened their first shop in Ealing.
Ellis Brigham		c. 1930s	Private company	34	Outdoor clothing and footwear	Founded by Frederick Ellis Brigham started out by making walking boots and cycling shoes, opening his first shop in Harpurhey. The business continues to be owned by the Brigham family.
Browns of York			Private company	4	Department store	Founded over 100 years ago, the Helmsley shop featured in ITV series Heartbeat.
Burberry		1856	Public company	12	Men's, ladies' and children's clothing brand	Luxury fashion brand started by Thomas Burberry in Basingstoke, Hampshire in 1856. The business opened its first London shop in 1891, and changed its name to Burberrys due to the colloquial use of the Burberrys of London name. The business stayed in family hands until Great Universal Shops bought the business in 1955. In 1998 the business changed its name back to Burberry, and in 2002 the business was floated on the London Stock market, with Great Universal Shops selling their final share in 2005.
Burtons		1904	Arcadia Group	400	Men's clothing and footwear	Founded by Montague Burton as The Cross-tailoring Company. Was once a member of FTSE 100, but now a brand name of the Arcadia Group.
Cad and the Dandy		2008	James Sleater, Ian Meiers	2	Men's tailors	Founded in 2008 as a tailoring brand, the business opened its first shop in 2009.
Calzedonia			The Calzedonia Group		Lingerie retailer	Italian lingerie retailer that opened its first UK shop in 2011.
Camper		1975	Private		Spanish footwear manufacturer and retailer	Founded by Lorenzo Fluxà Rosselló in Spain from a Spanish shoe manufacturer, opening its first shop in Barcelona in 1981.
Vince Camuto			Kurt Geiger	1	American designer shoes	Founded by the former Nine West designer, the sister brand of Kurt Gieger opened its first UK shop in 2013.
Canali		1934	Private company	1	Men's clothing	Founded as a men's clothing business in Italy by Giacomo Canali and Giovanni Canali. In 1996 Moss Brothers purchased the franchise rights for opening Canali shops in the UK, and opened its flagship shop on New Bond Street in 2000. In 2010 Moss Brothers relinquished the Canali franchise and re-branded the shops under other brands they operated.
Carven		1945	Private company	1	French designer ladieswear	Founded by Carven Mallet in Paris as an Haute Couture house. Opened its first UK shop, in a licence agreement with Club 21, in 2013.
Chanel		1909	Private		French designer brand	Founded by Gabrielle Bonheur Chanel, also known as Coco. Opened boutiques during the 1980s.
Cheap Monday		2000	H & M	1	Swedish jeans	Started by Örjan Andersson and Adam Friberg as a secondhand jeans shop in Stockholm, before starting selling their own clothing in 2004. In 2008 H & M bought the parent company Fabric Scandinavien AB, and the first UK shop opened in Carnaby Street, London in 2012.
Chester Barrie		1935	Prominent Europe	1	Men's tailors	Founded in 1935 by Simon Ackerman. At one time owned by Austin Reed.
Chittleborough & Morgan		1981		1	Men's tailors	Founded in 1981 as a bespoke tailor with no off the peg suits.
Jimmy Choo		1996	JAB Holding	5	Designer ladies' footwear	Founded by Jimmy Choo, a bespoke footwear designer in the East End of London along with Vogue accessories editor Tamara Mellon. Owned by JAB Holding since 2011. First shop opened in Motcomb Street in 1996. Also operate concessions within department stores.
Church's		1873		2	Footwear	Founded by Thomas Church and his three sons. Owned by Prada in the late 1990s, the business was expanded internationally. Supplied shoes used during Pierce Bronsan's tenure as James Bond.
Clarks		1825	Private limited company		Footwear	Founded by Cyrus & James Clark in Street, Somerset. 84 per cent of the business is still owned by the Clark family. It started retailing its own products in 1937 using initially the Peter Lord name.
Cloggs.co.uk		1979	JD Sports Fashion plc	3	Footwear	Founded in 1979 by Russell Thomas in Oasis Market, Birmingham. Went into administration in 2012 but was purchased by JD Sports Fashion plc in early 2013.
Coach, Inc.		1941	Public company	5	Men's and women's fashionwear	Founded as a leatherworking workshop on 34th Street, Manhattan, NY, US. The business opened its first UK shop in Sloane Square in the 1990s, as well as a shop in a shop inside Harrods. However this was not successful due to the weakness of the pound and the business pulled out of the UK. In 2010 Coach Inc signed a joint venture deal with Hackett to distribute their goods in UK, Spain, Portugal and Ireland as well as open standalone shops and concessions. In 2011 the first standalone shop was opened in New Bond Street, London.
COS		2007	H & M Hennes & Mauritz AB	14	Fashion brand	Collection of Style was first shown at a Royal Academy catwalk show in 2007, with the first shop opening in Regent Street, London in March of the same year. The business is positioned upmarket of parent H & M
Cotswold Outdoor		1974		70	Outdoor clothing and footwear	Founded in a garage next to the Cotswold Water Park selling basic camping equipment. Has operated as Cotswold Camping, Cotswold The Outdoor People and Cotswold Essential Outdoors
Corneliani		1958	Corneliani family	1	Italian menswear manufacturer and retailer	Founded as a coat manufacturer in Italy, the business opened its first UK shop on the site of Beale & Inman at 131–132 New Bond Street in 2008.
Cotton Traders		1987	Fran Cotton & Steve Smith	125	Men's and women's clothing	Founded by former England Rugby players Fran Cotton and Steve Smith as a mail order rugby shirt retailer based in Altrincham. In 1997 Next purchased 33 per cent share of the business, but this was bought back by the founders in 2014.
Craghoppers		1965	Regatta	4	British outdoor clothing manufacturer and supplier	Founded in West Yorkshire, the business was purchased by the Regatta group in 1995. The business operates four outlet shops.
Crockett & Jones		1879	Private company	7	British luxury shoes	Founded by Charles Jones and Sir James Crockett in Northampton, England. Daniel Craig's James Bond in Skyfall wore a pair of Crockett & Jones shoes.
Crombie		1805	Private company	3	Men's and women's fashion brand	Founded as J&J Crombie Ltd by John Crombie and his son James in Aberdeen, Scotland as a manufacturer. The business started making coats under their own label, and eventually retailing at three UK locations and 40+ stockists worldwide.
DAKS		1894	Sankyo Seiko Co. Limited	2	Men's and ladies' fashion brand	Founded as S. Simpson by Simeon Simpson was a manufacturer of bespoke tailoring based in London. In 1935 Simeon's son Alexander invented the first supporting trouser, and branded it DAKS. In 1936 Alexander opened the first Simpsons shop—Simpsons of Piccadilly—to sell the company's clothing. In 1991 the business was sold to Sankyo Seiko Co. Limited, who at the turn of the century moved the shop from Piccadilly to Old Bond Street and renamed the business DAKS.
W. J. Daniel & Co.		1901	Private company	3	Department store	Founded by Walter James Daniel in Oxford and is a royal warrant holder.
Davies and Son		1803	Alan Bennett	1	Men's tailoring	Founded in Hanover Street in 1803, it moved to its current location in Savile Row in 1986. Owns several other tailoring companies—Bostridge and Curties and Watson, Fargerstrom and Hughes, Johns and Pegg, James and James, Wells of Mayfair and Fallan & Harvey.
Debenhams		1778	Public limited company	178	Department store	Founded by William Clark in 1778 at Wigmore Street, London. Since 1993 the business has the 'Designers at Debenhams' brand, which sees designer clothing at High Street prices, with designers including Jasper Conran, John Rocha, Betty Jackson Black, Butterfly by Matthew Williamson, H! by Henry Holland, Star by Julien Macdonald, Frost French, Erickson Beamon, Eric Van Peterson, Janet Reger, Pip Hackett, Melissa Odabash, Ted Baker, St George by Duffer, Jeff Banks, and Ben de Lisi.
Decathlon		1976		17	Sports clothing and footwear	Founded in Lille, France. Came to the UK in 1999.
Dege & Skinner		1865	Skinner family	1	Men's tailors	Founded as J. Dege & Sons, William Skinner Jnr. joined the firm in 1916. Name changed to Dege & Skinner after the Skinner family took control.
Desigual		1984	Private company	2	Spanish fashion brand	Founded by Swiss Thomas Meyer in Ibiza, Spain as a fashion brand, the first shop opened in Spain in 1986. The business opened its first UK shop in 2010.
Diesel		1978	OTB Group	17	Italian designer brand	Italian designer brand that opened its first UK retail shop in 1996.
Diesel Black Gold		2008	OTB Group	1	Italian designer brand	Designer brand launched in 2008 by Diesel, with its first shop opening in Conduit Street, London in 2014.
Dior		1946	Groupe Arnault SAS	5	French designer brand	Founded as a fashion house in Paris, the business has five standalone shops and several concessions spread across London.
Dolce & Gabbana		1985	Private company	5	Italian designer brand	Italian designer brand that operates five shops and a concession in London.
Dorothy Perkins		1909	Arcadia Group	600	Ladies' clothing and footwear	Founded in 1909 as H. P. Newman, the shop changed its name to Dorothy Perkins in 1919. Purchased from the Farmer family in 1979 by Burtons.
Dr. Martens		1947	Permira	23	Footwear brand	Founded as a shoe design by Dr. Karl Märtens in Munich, the design was licensed to British shoe manufacturer R. Griggs Group Ltd who anglicised the name, changed the heel and added trademark yellow stitching. In 1994 the business opened its first shop in Covent Garden. In 2013 the business was purchased by Permira.
Drake's		1977	Michael Hill & Mark Cho	2	Men's shirt and tie manufacturer	Founded by Michael Drake as a scarf manufacturer. They went on to make ties, pocket squares and shirts. They opened their flagship shop in Clifford Street in 2011.
DSquared2		1994	Private company	1	Designer brand	Founded by Dean and Dan Caten with funding from employers Diesel. The UK shop opened in March 2015.
Duchamp		1989	Private company	2	Men's clothing	Founded by Mitchell Jacobs in Suffolk as a cufflink brand. Opened first boutique in Notting Hill, London in 1998. In 2006 Mitchell Jacobs sold the business.
Ducker & Son		1898	Private limited company	1	Footwear	Founded by Edward Ducker in Oxford, where they are still based. Appeared in the film Atonement and has many well-known customers.
Dunnes Stores		1944	Dunne family	19	Men's, ladies' and children's clothing and footwear	Founded by Ben Dunne in Cork, Ireland as a drapery. Became a full line department store opening its first UK store in the 1970s.
DW Sports Fitness		2009	Whelan family	60	Sports clothing	Founded by Dave Whelan in March 2009 after purchasing 50 JJB Sports Fitness clubs and their attached sports shop.

=== E–H ===
Clothing shops in UK	Image	Established in UK	Owned by	Number of shops	Type of shop	Notes
ECCO		1963	Privately owned company	46	Footwear retailer	Danish footwear manufacturer and retailer started in Bredebro by Karl Toosbuy. The first ECCO shops in the UK were franchises run by former Clarks executive Michael Fiennes, who grew the number of shops to 17 by 1999, before ECCO took over the running of the brand's shops.
Ede & Ravenscroft		1689	Private limited company	6	Men's tailors	The company was founded in 1689 by William and Martha Shudall. The present name dates from 1902 and is a result of the inheriting of the business by Joseph Ede and then merging with wig-maker Ravenscroft. They have three shops in London, and also in Oxford, Cambridge and Edinburgh. The company holds the Royal warrant as "Purveyors to the British Royal Family" as robemakers to the Queen, Prince Philip and Prince Charles.
Edinburgh Woollen Mill		1970	Edinburgh Woollen Mill Ltd	192	Men's and ladies' clothing	Created by the Langholm Dyeing and Finishing Company. First shop opened Randolph Place, Edinburgh.
Elevate Your Sole		2013	Private Company	3	Footwear and ladies clothing	Founded by Hal Holmes-Pierce in High Street, Prestatyn, 2020.
Emmett London		1992	Private company	4	Men's shirt maker and retailer	Founded by Robert Emmett in Kings Road, London in 1992.
English Cut		2001		1	Men's tailor	Founded by Thomas Mahon, who had previously started Steed Bespoke Tailors. Known to provide suits for the Prince of Wales.
Etro		1968	Private company	1	Italian designer brand	Italian designer brand started by Gimmo Etra. The business opened its first stand alone UK shop in August 2011.
Evans		1930	Arcadia Group	180	Ladies' clothing	Founded in 1930 by manufacturer Jack Green. Purchased by Burtons in 1970.
Timothy Everest		1989	Timothy Everest	1	Men's tailors	Welsh bespoke tailor and designer who started out on his own in 1989, opening his first shop in London in 1993.
Nicole Farhi		1982	Private limited company	2	Men's and ladies' clothing	Started as a high end fashion label within French Connection. In 2010 sold by French Connection to Opengate Connection, but in 2013 the business went into administration. The business was saved by Maxine Hargreaves-Adams, the daughter of Matalan founder John Hargreaves.
Fat Face		1988	Bridgepoint Capital	209	Men's, ladies' and children's clothing	Founded by Tim Slade and Jules Leaver as a business selling T-shirts at ski resorts, the business opened its first retail shop in 1993. In 2007 the business was acquired by Bridgepoint Capital.
Fendi		1925	LVMH	4	Italian designer brand	Founded in Rome by Edoardo and Adele Fendi as a fur and leather shop. Since 2001 the business has been part of LVMH.
Fenwicks	.	1882	Fenwick family	11	Department store	Founded in Newcastle by John James Fenwick. Now operates 11 department stores including subsidiaries Bentalls and William & Griffin.
Field and Trek		1973	Sports Direct	6	Outdoor clothing	Founded in 1973, the outdoor clothing and camping specialists had expanded to 11 shops when Sports Direct purchased 60 per cent of the business in 2007.
Flannels		1976	Sports Direct/ Neil Prosser	20	Designerwear	Set up by Neil Prosser in Knutsford, Cheshire in 1976 as a menswear shop. In 1994 they expanded into womenswear. In 2012 Sports Direct bought a 51% share.
Anne Fontaine		1987	Private company	2	French designer brand	Founded by Anne Fontaine, with her first boutique opening in Paris in 1994. Famous for white shirts.
Foot Locker		1974	Foot Locker Retail Inc.		Sports footwear retailer	Founded by Woolworth company, Kinney Shoe Corporation in 1974.
Tom Ford		2006	Private company	1	American designer label	Founded by Tom Ford, the former creative director of Gucci and YSL. The first standalone UK shop opened in Sloane Street, London in 2012.
French Connection		1972	PLC	38	Men's and ladies' clothing	Founded by Stephen Marks as a ladies' mid-market brand, the business expanded into menswear in 1976. It now operates over 130 shops across UK & Europe.
Gant		1949	Maus Frères	16	American designer brand	Founded as a shirt manufacturer in America, the retail business was started by the former Swedish franchise owner Pyramid Sportswear. The business is now owned by Swiss department store group Maus Frères.
Gap		1969	Gap Inc.	148	Men's, children's and ladies' clothing and footwear	Founded by Donald and Doris Fisher in San Francisco in 1969. First UK shop opened in 1987
Garment Quarter		2010	John Reid, Peter Lake, Christopher Atkinson and Michael Barker	1	Men's and ladies' clothing and footwear	Founded in Bristol as an independent fashion boutique.
Kurt Geiger		1963	Sycamore Partners		Footwear retailer	Founded by Kurt Geiger, an Austrian who opened his first shop in Bond Street, London.
Geox		1995	Private company		Footwear and clothing manufacturer and retailer	Founded in Italy by Mario Polegato. The second largest shoe manufacturer in the world after Clarks.
Ghost		1984	Touker Suleyman	3	Ladies' fashion brand and boutiques	Founded by Tanya Sarne and Katharine Hamnett in London. Started out as a fashion label, it was purchased by Kevin Stanford and investment company Arev and went on to have 32 shops across the UK. The business went into administration in 2008 and was saved by Touker Suleyman. It now operates three shops and several concessions in department stores.
Gieves & Hawkes		1974	Trinity Ltd	5	Men's tailors	Founded as two separate companies – Gieves (1887) and Hawkes (1771). Merged after Gieves & Co purchased Hawkes & Co. Based at No. 1 Savile Row.
Goat		2001	Private company	1	Designer lgadieswear	Founded by Jane Lewis as a designer knitwear brand, the business opened its first shop at Conduit Street, London.
Greenwoods		1860	Pacific Trend Investment	80	Men's clothing	Founded by William Greenwood as a hatters shop. At its peak in the 1990s the business had over 200 shops, but after entering administration in 2009 it now has 80 shops.
Grenson		1866	Private company	4	British handmade shoes	Handmade shoe manufacturer that started by William Green in Rushden, UK. Business was renamed Grenson, as a shortening of William Green & Son in 1913. The business opened its first retail shop in Liverpool Street, London in 2008.
Gucci		1921	Kering	8	Italian designer brand	Founded in Florence, Italy by Guccio Gucci. The business operates eight stand-alone shops in the UK and several concessions in department stores.
Guess		1981	Public company	13	American designer brand	Founded by Paul and Maurice Marciano in Beverley Hills, Los Angeles US. Guess re-entered the UK market in 2004 with a shop in Covent Garden.
H&M		1946	H & M Hennes & Mauritz AB	240	Men's, children's and ladies' clothing and footwear	Founded in Sweden by Erling Persson, with the first UK shop opening in 1976 – its first outside of Scandinavia. Originally traded as Hennes in UK.
Hackett London		1979	M1 and by LVMH subsidiary – L Capital Asia	13	Men's clothing	Founded by Jeremy Hackett and Ashley Lloyd-Jennings from a stall on London's Portobello Road, with the first shop opening in Kings Road, Chelsea. Operates 13 shops in UK plus concessions, which is a total of 77 shops across 16 countries.
Harrods		1834	Qatar Holdings	1	Department store	Upmarket department store in Knightsbridge, London which was founded by Charles Henry Harrod.
Harvey Nichols		1831	Dickson Concepts	7	Department store	Founded by Benjamin Harvey as a linen shop within a house on the corner of Sloane Street and Knightsbridge. In 1991 Dickson Concepts purchased the business from the Burton Group, and expanded the business to 14 shops across the world.
Hawes & Curtis		1913	Low Profile Holdings	25	Men's clothing	The company was founded by two outfitters, Ralph Hawes and Freddie Curtis, who opened the first shop in Piccadily Arcade at the corner with Jermyn Street, in London in 1913.
Hermès		1837	Public company	5	French designer brand	Started as a harness manufacturer by Thierry Hermès. Operates stand alone shops and concessions within department stores.
High and Mighty		1956	J D Williams	17	Large sized clothing	Founded as Northern Outsize Menswear by Bernard Levy as a mail order firm. The business opened its first shop on Edgware Road, London in 1959. During the 1970s the business changed its name to High and Mighty. In 2009 the business was purchased out of administration by J D Williams.
Tommy Hilfiger		1985	PVH	8	American fashion brand	American designer brand that opened its flagship shop in Brompton Road, London in August 2011.
Hobbs London		1981	Private	60	Ladies' upmarket brand	Founded as a shoe brand, the business has expanded to sell a full range of clothing.
Hobbs Sports			Jarrolds	1	Independent sports retailer	Independent sports retailer based in Cambridge owned by Jarrolds department store.
Hollister		2000	Abercrombie & Fitch	15	Fashion brand	Founded by Abercromie & Fitch as a brand aimed at 14- to 18-year-olds, the business opened its first shop in the UK at Brent Cross in October 2008.
Hoopers		1982	Private company	4	Department store	Department store chain founded in Torquay. Expanded to take in three former department stores across the UK.
House of Fraser		1849	Sanpower & Mike Ashley	60	Men's, children's and ladies' clothing and footwear	Department store chain founded in Glasgow by Hugh Fraser. In 1948 it was listed on the London Stock Exchange. In 1985 the business was purchased by the Al-Fayed family, but returned as a public company in 1994. In 2006 it was purchased by the Highland consortium, before being purchased by Sanpower.
House of Hackney		2010	Private company	1	Clothing and houseware design house	Founded as a print based brand of homewares, the founders Javvy Royle and Frieda Gormley moved into clothing. The British made goods brand opened its flagship shop in Shoreditch High Street in 2013.
T J Hughes		1912	Lewis's Home Retail Ltd	16	Department store	Founded as a small shop on Liverpool's London Road, in 1925 the business was offered the former Owen Owen shop for part ownership of the business. In 1992 the business was floated, before being purchased by JJB Sports in 2000. In 2002 the business was purchased by PPM Capital, who had sold the business to Silverfleet Capital in 2003. The business expanded to 57 shops however in 2011 the business was sold to Endless LLP, a turnaround specialist but they put the business into administration in June 2011. Six of the shops and the trading name were purchased from the administrators by Lewis's Home Retail.
William Hunt			Private company	1	Men's bespoke tailors	Founded by William Hunt, a former professional footballer on the Kings Road, the Savile Row shop opened in 1998.
Hunter		1856	Private company	1	Footwear manufacturer and retailer	Founded as the North British Rubber Company by American Henry Lee Norris, the manufacturer of Green Welly boots branched initially into retail in 2006 with a shop in Carnaby Street. However, in 2015 a new shop was opened in Regent Street, London.
Huntsman, Savile Row Tailor		1849	Pierre Lagrange	1	Men's clothing	Founded by Henry Huntsman, from previous business H. Huntsman, a breeches maker. One of the founders of the Savile Row Bespoke Association

=== I–M ===
Clothing shops in UK	Image	Established in UK	Owned by	Number of shops	Type of shop	Notes
Donna Ida		2006	Donna Ida	2	Ladies' jean boutiques	Founded by Donna Ida in Chelsea, London, the business sells ladies' jeans in its London shops.
Intimissimi		1996	The Calzedonia Group	6	Underwear manufacturer and retailer	Italian brand founded in Dossobuono di Villafranca di Verona.
J.Crew		1947	Private	5	Men's, women's and children's clothing and footwear	Founded as Popular Merchandise, Inc, during the 1980s the business expanded into the catalogue market with Popular Club Plan. In 1989 the business became J. Crew and opened its first retail shop. Its first UK shop opened in Regents Street in 2011.
Jacamo		2007	N Brown group	0	Men's clothing and footwear	Online brand of N Brown Group, which opened its first physical shops in 2011. Dual branded shops with Simply Be.
Jack & Jones		1990	Bestseller	47	Jeanswear	Jeanswear firm started by Bestseller in 1990.
Jaegar		1884	Better Capital	45	Men's and ladies' clothing	Founded by Lewis Tomalin as Dr Jaeger's Sanitary Woollen System Co Ltd in 1884, capitalising on a craze for wool-jersey long johns inspired by the theories of German scientist Dr Gustav Jaeger. The company's flagship shop opened on Regent Street in the 1930s.
Richard James		1992	Private company	2	Men's tailors	Savile Row tailor shop founded by former British Fashion Council's Menswear and Bespoke Designer of the Year.
JD Sports		1981	PLC – majority shareholder Pentland Group	800	Men's, children's and ladies' sports clothing and footwear	Started in Bury by John and David Makin. Became a plc in 1996. In 2005 Pentland Group bought out the Makins.
Jigsaw		1972	Robinson Webster (Holdings) Ltd	56	Men's, children's and ladies' clothing	The company was started in 1972 by John Robinson and Malcolm Webster.
JoJo Maman Bébé		1993	Private limited company	65	Children's clothing	Founded by Laura Tenison as a mail order business.
Jones Bootmaker		1857	Endless LLP	72	Footwear retailer	Founded by Alfred Jones in Bayswater, London.
Joseph		1972		18	Men's and ladies' clothing	Founded by Joseph Ettedgui and his family in Kings Road, Chelsea below their hairdressing salon. First large scale retail shop opened in Sloane Street in 1979, designed by Norman Foster. It has been owned by Onward Kashiyama since 2005.
Joules		1977	Private company	92	British fashion and lifestyle brand	Founded by Ian Joule as Joule & Sons, the business originally sold branded clothing and accessories at equestrian and country shows. In 1994 the business rebranded as Joules, and in 1999 launched its own clothing collection. In 2000 the brand opened its first shop, in Market Harborough and has since opened 92 branches and several concessions across the UK.
Juicy Couture		1995	Authentic Brands Group	5	American fashion brand	Founded in California, initially as Travis Jeans. The first UK shop was opened in 2009 in Bruton Street, London.
Donna Karan New York		1984	LVMH	1	American designer brand	Founded by Donna Karan in New York, the business opened its only UK shop in Conduit Street, London in 1997.
Kilgour & French		1882	Fung Group	1	Men's tailors	Founded in 1882 as T & F French in Piccadilly, in 1923 French merged with existing Savile Row tailor A. H. Kilgour to form Kilgour & French. Owned by Fung Group since 2013.
The Kooples		2008	Private company	14	French designer shop	Started by the Elisha brothers in Paris, the first UK shop opened in 2010. Also operates concessions within Harrods and Selfridges.
Michael Kors		1981	Public		American designer brand	American designer brand started by Michael Kors in 1981. First UK shop opened in Regent Street, London in 2015.
Lacoste		1933	Maus Frères	11	French clothing company	Founded by former French tennis player Rene Lacoste. The UK flagship shop in Brompton Road, London opened in 2012.
Lady Jane	Lady Jane Boutique – Carnaby Street – 1966	1966	Henry Moss & Harry Fox	1	Ladies' fashion boutique	Iconic first ladies' fashion boutique opened in Carnaby Street in London. Moss followed this with Sweet Fanny Adams, Pussy Galore & The London Mob. Moss also created some of the original fashion designs.
Karl Lagerfeld		1974	Private	1	German fashion designer brand	Founded by the German fashion designer of the same name. Lagerfeld has also been the head designer of Chanel and Fendi. His boutique on Regent Street, London, opened in November 2013.
Lanvin		1889	Harmonie S.A.	1	Men's tailors	Founded as a dressmaker in France by Jeanne Lanvin. The menswear shop opened in London in 2008.
Ralph Lauren		1967	Public company	19	American designer brand	Founded by Ralph Lauren as a men's tie brand, the first UK shop opened in New Bond Street, London in 1981.
Le Coq Sportif		1882	Public company	1	French sportswear manufacturer	Founded by Émile Camuset in France, the business opened its first stand alone shop in the UK in 2013.
Leekes		1897	Private company	7	Outdoor clothing and footwear	Founded in Rhondda, Wales by James Henry Leeke as a builder's merchants. In the 1970s the business expanded into department stores offering outdoor clothing and footwear.
The Left Shoe Company		1998	Private company	1	Made to measure footwear company	Made to measure footwear company based in London, Los Angeles and Helsinki.
T. M. Lewin		1898	Private company	75	Men's shirt retailer	Founded by Thomas Mayes Lewin in Jermyn Street. In the 1980s the business started to expand by opening its second shop at Lime Street, London.
John Lewis		1864	John Lewis Partnership	42	Men's, children's and ladies' clothing and footwear	Started by John Lewis in Oxford Street, London. In 1920 was incorporated into John Lewis Partnership. Largest department store in volume of revenue.
Lillywhites		1863	Sports Direct	1	Men's, children's and ladies' sports clothing and footwear	Founded by the Lillywhite family in Haymarket, London. Moved to their current location at 25 Regent Street, London in 1925. Opened shops in numerous city locations. At one time owned by the Forte Group, it was purchased by Jerónimo Martins in 1996. The business struggled in the competitive UK sports market and in 2002 was sold to Sports Direct. Shops were changed to Sports Direct or closed between 2002 and 2012, leaving the Regent Street shop as the sole location.
Phillip Lim		2005	Private company	1	American designer of ladieswear	Created by Phillip Lim, an American designer in 2005. The London shop opened in 2013.
Liu·Jo		1995	Private company	1	Italian designer brand	Founded by the Marchi brothers in Carpi, Italy.
Henri Lloyd		1963	Private company	9	Manufacturer and retailer of sailing, yachting and golfing apparel	Founded by Angus Lloyd and Henri Strzelecki in Manchester. Operates its own shops and concessions in House of Fraser.
Long Tall Sally Clothing		1976	Amery Capital	11	Ladies' clothing	The first shop was opened in 1976 on Chiltern Street in the West End of London. The business is a clothing and shoe brand for tall women 5'8" and over.
Loro Piana		c.19th century	LVMH	2	Italian designer brand	Started in the 19th century by the Loro Piana family as wool fabric merchants. In 2013 80% of the business was purchased by LVMH.
Christian Louboutin		1991	Private company	3	French designer shoes	Founded in Paris, the business operates 3 stand alone shops in London and concessions within Selfridges and Harvey Nicholls.
Lululemon Athletica		1998			Sportswear	Founded in Vancouver, Canada in 1998 by Chip Wilson. Opened its first UK shop in Covent Garden in February 2014.
Lyle & Scott		1874	Private company	1	British designer brand	Founded as a knitwear firm in the Scottish town of Hawick, the business opened its first retail shop in London in 2005.
M&Co.		1834	Iain McGeoch	270	Men's, children's and ladies' clothing and footwear	Founded by McGeoch family as pawnbrokers in Paisley, Renfrewshire. Converted to clothing in 1953. In 1973 adopted Mackay's name. M&Co brand launched in 2003, with all shops being rebranded by 2007.
Mango		1995	Mango MNG Holding	56	Fashion shop	Founded by brothers Isak Andic and Nahman Andic in Barcelona.
E. Marinella		1914	Maurizio Marinella	1	Italian designer ties	Founded by Eugenio Marinella in 1914 in Naples.
Marks & Spencer		1884	Public limited company	800	Men's, children's and ladies' clothing and footwear	The company was founded by Michael Marks and Thomas Spencer in 1884 as a penny bazaar in Leeds Kirkgate Market. It now one of the UK's largest clothing retailers and also sells shoes.
Massimo Dutti		1985	Inditex Group	11	Fashionwear retailer	Founded as a men's clothing manufacturer in 1985, the business was purchased by Inditex Group in 1991, who expanded the range to women's clothing in 1992. The first UK Shop was opened on Regent Street, London in 2003.
Matalan		1985	John Hargreaves	217	Men's, children's and ladies' clothing and footwear	Founded by John Hargreaves in Preston.
Matches Fashion		c.1990s		4	Men's and ladies' clothing	Founded in London, it is now an international retailer with retail shops and an online site.
Max Mara		1951	Private	4	Italian designer brand	Founded by Achille Maramotti in Italy. Operates four stand alone shops and concessions in department stores.
McQ		2012	Gucci	1	British fashion designer brand	Launched in 2006 as a lower price range to Alexander McQueen, the business opened its first shop in Spitalfields in 2012.
Alexander McQueen		2000	Gucci	2	British fashion designer brand	Founded as a fashion house by Alexander McQueen, the business was bought by Gucci in 2000 and opened retail shops across the globe.
Menarys		1923	Alexander family	20	Men's, children's and ladies' clothing and footwear	Founded by Joseph Alexander in Cookstown as a drapery. In 1970s bought Menary Brothers and changed the group name to this. Now operates as a department store.
Mexx		1986	Eroglu Holding	17	Men's, women's and children's clothing and accessories	Started by fashion designer Rattan Chadha and his business partners PK Sen Sharma, Adu Advaney, Suveer Arora, Ronny Lemmens, Horatio Ho and Arun Mehta in the 1970s as a supplier of clothes for department and wholesale shops in the Netherlands. In 1980 they created two popular clothing brands—"Moustache" for men and "Emanuelle" for women, and in 1986 brought these together a M (from Moustache) + E (from Emanuelle) + XX (an abbreviation for "kiss kiss") to create MEXX. In the UK the business has 17 shops mainly in Northern Ireland.
Karen Millen		1981	Private limited company	84		Founded by Karen Millen and Kevin Stanford. First shop opened in 1983. Bought by Mosaic Fashions, owners of Oasis in 2004. Mosaic went into administration in 2009. Bought out by the management team under Aurora Fashions. Karen Millen was split off as an independent company in 2011.
Miss Selfridge		1966	Arcadia Group	170+	Ladies' clothing	Founded as the young fashion section of Selfridges department store by Charles Clore. Later opened in Lewis department stores and as separate shops. In 1999 Miss Selfridge was purchased by Arcadia Group as part of Sir Philip Green's purchase of Sears plc.
Monsoon		1973	Peter Simon	400	Children's and ladies' clothing	Started by Peter Simon in Portabello Road market in 1972, opening his first Monsoon shop in 1973.
Moschino		1983	Public company	1	Italian designer brand	Founded in Milan by Franco Moschino.
Moss Bros Group		1851	Public company	150+	Men's clothing	Founded by Moses Moss in Covent Garden. Has owned several brands including the UK retail arm of Hugo Boss.
Mothercare		1961	Public company	79	Ladies' maternity and children's clothing and footwear	Founded by Selim Zilkha & Sir James Goldsmith are purchasing 50-shop W. J. Harris nursery furniture chain. Became a public company in 1972. Merged with Habitat in 1982, and then BHS in 1986 to form Shophouse plc. Purchased Children's World from Boots in 1996 and rebranded Mothercare World. In 1999 Shophouse changed its name to Mothercare plc after the sale of BHS to Sir Philip Green.
Mountain Warehouse		1997	Mark Neale	160	Men's, ladies' and children's outdoor clothing and footwear	Started life as retail arm of Karrimor. Name changed to Mountain Warehouse after sale of Karrimor in 1999. Business changed hands in 2002; 2007; 2010 and finally in 2013 to its former founder Mark Neale.

=== N–P ===
Clothing shops in UK	Image	Established in UK	Owned by	Number of shops	Type of shop	Notes
Nanook			Private company	2	Ladies' independent boutique	Ladies' boutique specializing in Italian design, based in Suffolk.
Nevisport		1970	Jacobs & Turner Ltd	12	Men's, children's and ladies' outdoor clothing and footwear	Founded in Fort William by Ian A. Sykes MBE and Ian D. Sutherland. Acquired by Jacobs & Turner in 2007.
New Look		1969	Brait SA	569	Men's, children's and ladies' clothing and footwear	Started in Taunton by Tony Singh. Purchased by Brait SA in May 2015.
Next		1982	Next plc	511	Men's, children's and ladies' clothing and footwear	Started in 1982 after the purchase of Kendall & Sons Ltd by clothing manufacturer Joseph Hepworth. In 1984 J Hepworth & Son changes its name to NEXT plc.
Nine West		1973		4	Footwear retailer	Founded in New York in 1973.
Jane Norman		1955	Edinburgh Woollen Mills	0	Men's and ladies' clothing	Founded by Norman Freed in 1955, the business was sold to Graphite Capital in 2002 for £70m. In 2005 it was purchased by Bagur before going into administration in 2011. Edinburgh Woollen Mills bought the brand and 33 of its 116 shops, but in 2014 the business again was put into administration and bought out in a pre-packaged deal by Edinburgh Woollen Mills. All shops were closed and the business now operates concessions in department stores and online.
Norton & Sons		1821	Patrick Grant	1	Men's tailors	Norton & Sons is a Savile Row bespoke tailor founded in 1821 by Walter Grant Norton. The firm is located at 16 Savile Row.
Nudie Jeans		2001	Private company	2	Swedish designer jeans brand	Founded as a subsidiary of Svenska Jeans AB by Maria Erixon in 2001, opening its first shop in Soho, London in 2014.
Oasis		1991	Aurora Fashions	300	Ladies' clothing	Floated in 1995, in 2001 business was purchased by a management buyout. A second buyout occurred in 2004. This buyout called Mosaic Fashions went into administration in 2009. Bought out by another management team under Aurora Fashions.
Office		1981	Silverfleet Capital	99	Men's and ladies' footwear	Formed as a concession in Hyper Hyper, before opening its first shop in 1984.
Offspring		1996	Silverfleet Capital	6	Men's and ladies' sports clothing and footwear	Fashion sports shops created by Office.
The Original Factory Shop		1969	Duke Street Capital	190	Men's, children's and ladies' clothing and footwear	Discounter starting life by selling soap overmade by one of founder Peter Blacks factories.
Orlebar Brown		2007	Private company	5	Menswear	Swimwear designer brand started in March 2007.
Orvis		1856	Private	19	Outdoor clothing	Founded in America by Charles F. Orvis, the family-owned retail and mail-order business specialises in high-end fly fishing, hunting and sporting goods.
Outfit		1995	Arcadia Group	70	Men's and ladies' clothing	Opened by Sears plc in Reading, the shop sold the brands of Sears plc in out of town locations. Purchased by Sir Philip Green in 1999, and became part of Arcadia Group.
Pal Zileri		1980	Private company	1	Italian designer menswear	Founded by Gianfranco Barizza and Aronne Miola and named after an ancient building in the historic centre of Vicenza.
Pavers Shoes		1971	Private limited company	100	Footwear retailer	Family owned business started in York by Catherine Paver, initially as shoe parties. First shop opened in Scarborough.
Peacocks		1884	Edinburgh Woollen Mill Ltd	388	Men's, children's and ladies' clothing and footwear	Started as Peacocks Penny Bazaar in Warrington. Went public in 1999, before a management buyout in 2005. Went into administration in 2012 before being purchased by Edinburgh Woollen Mill.
N.Peal		1936	Adam Holdsworth	11	Luxury cashmere knitwear and accessories specialist	Founded by Nat Peal in 1936 as a men's haberdashery in London's Burlington Arcade. In 2007 the business was purchased by Adam Holdsworth and Nick Falkingham.
Pep&Co		2015	Pepkor UK	50	Clothing discounter	Founded by Andy Bond, a former Asda executive and South African retail business Pepkor. The business opened 50 shops in 50 days.
Phase Eight		1979	Private limited company	106	Women's clothing	Founded by Patsy Seddon at Wandsworth Common, London.
Thomas Pink		1984	LVMH	31	Men's and women's fashion brand	Founded by brothers James, Peter and John Mullen as a specialist shirt company based in London. In 2011 the business opened its first shops in Washington DC, Edinburgh, and a concession within Harrods in London.
Pinko		c.1980s	Private company	1	Italian designer brand	Founded in the early 1980s by Pietro Negra and Cristina Rubini, the business operates one stand alone shop and concessions within Harvey Nicholls and Harrods.
Henry Poole & Co		1806	Angus & Simon Cundey	1	Men's tailors	Opened in Brunswick Square, London before moving to Savile Row in 1846. Moved to Cork Street in 1961 before returning to Savile Row in 1982.
Poste		2000	Office Holdings		Men's footwear retailer	Upmarket boutique footwear retailer started by Office.
Poste Mistress		2001	Office Holdings		Women's footwear retailer	Upmarket boutique footwear retailer started by Office.
Prada		1913	Public company	3	Italian designer brand	Founded by Mario Prada in Milan, Italy. The business operates three stand alone shops and concessions in several department stores.
Pretty Eccentric		2009		1	Ladies' clothing and footwear	Founded in 2009 by Michelle Scott.
Primark		1969	Associated British Foods	167	Men's, children's and ladies' clothing and footwear	Opened by Arthur Ryan in Dublin as Penneys. Opened first UK shop in Belfast in 1971.
Pull & Bear		1986	Inditex Group	7	Fashionwear retailer	Founded as New Wear S.a. in Naron, Galicia, Spain in 1986. The business became part of Inditex Group who rebranded the business as Pull & bear in 1991, and opened its first UK shop in 2008.

=== Q–S ===
Clothing shops in UK	Image	Established in UK	Owned by	Number of shops	Type of shop	Notes
QD		1984	QD Commercial Group Holdings	25	Men's, children's and ladies' clothing and footwear	Founded in Norwich under the name Quality Discounts. Multi-range discounter. Some shops have in shop Brantano concessions.
Red Wing Shoes		1905	Private company	1	American footwear manufacturer	Founded in Red Wing, Minnesota by Charles H. Beckman, the business operates a stand-alone shop in London selling their own brand of shoes.
Reebok		1895	Adidas		Sports clothing and footwear	Founded as running shoe company J W Foster & Sons, the business opened its first stand alone shop in 2004 in Covent Garden, London. The business was bought by Adidas in 2005. In 2011 Reebok opened its new retail concept Reebok Fithub.
Reiss		1971	Reiss family	56	Men's and women's fashion brand	Founded by the Reiss family in 1971, the business operates 56 shops and several concessions across the UK.
Rigby & Peller		1939	Van de Velde	7	Ladies' underwear	Ladies' underwear retailer founded in 1939 by Hungarian immigrant Gita Peller and Bertha Rigby, an English corsetière at South Molton Street in London's West End. In 2011 87 per cent of the business was purchased by Belgium manufacturer Van de Velde.
Marina Rinaldi		1980	Max Mara	1	Italian designer ladies' brand	Founded by the Italian Max Mara company as a plus size designer brand, the business operates one stand alone UK shop and concessions within several department stores.
River Island		1947	Lewis Trust Group	248	Men's and ladies' clothing and footwear	Founded by Bernard Lewis under the name Lewis Separates, the business changed name to Chelsea Girl in 1965. In 1988 it merged with its menswear operation Concept Man to form River Island, with all shops being re-branded by 1991.
Rohan		1972	The Cann Trust	61	Outdoor clothing retailer and manufacturer	Founded by Paul Howcroft and his wife Sarah, the business was purchased by Clarks in 1988. In 1996 it was sold to a management buyout, before changing hands again in 2001. In 2007 the business was purchased by The Cann Trust and Colin Fisher.
Rohmir		2007	Private company	1	French designer brand	Founded in Monaco by Olga Roh. The only UK shop is based in London.
Roman		1957	Private company	91	Women's fashion brand	Family owned women's dresses and casual clothing brand. Designer of the 2015 viral phenomenon The dress.
Rupert and Buckley		2011	Private limited company	3	University focused brand	Founded by James Buckley Thorp as an upmarket brand aimed at University students. In 2014 they opened their flagship shop at 5 Burton Street, Bath.
Russell & Bromley		1873	Private limited company	43	Footwear retailer	Founded in 1873 by the marriage of George Bromley to his employers daughter Elizabeth Russell, with the first shop carrying the name in Eastbourne. Opened its first Bond Street shop in 1947.
Sonia Rykiel		1962	Private company	1	French designer brand	Founded by Sonia Rykiel in Paris, the business was 80 per cent purchased by Fung Brands in 2012.
Sainsbury's		1869	Publicly traded on the London Stock Exchange	1203	Men's, children's and ladies' clothing and footwear	Sainsburys started selling clothes in its jointly run Savacentres (with BHS). In 2004 it launched its TU clothing range
The Savoy Taylors Guild			Moss Brothers Group		Men's tailors	Men's tailors founded next door to the Savoy Hotel, which was purchased by Cecil Gee, before becoming part of Moss Brothers in 1988. In 2000 many of the Guild shops were converted to the new Code brand created by Moss Brothers, however by 2002 the Code name was dropped, and Savor Taylor Guild became the business' upmarket brand.
Scabal		1938	Private company	1	Men's tailors	Founded as a cloth merchant, the textile manufacturer produces and retails suits, jackets and shirts.
Schuh		1981	Genesco	118	Fotwear retailer	Founded in Edinburgh by Sandy Alexander, it remained as an independent business until it was purchased by a plc. In 1990 a management buyout occurred before being purchased by Genesco, a US footwear retailer in 2011.
Scotch & Soda		c.1980s	Private company	2	Dutch designer brand	Dutch designer brand that opened its first UK shop in London in 2012.
Maurice Sedwell		1938	Andrew Ramroop	1	Men's tailors	Founded by Maurice Sedwell in Fleet Street, the business moved to 9 Savile Row in 1963. In 1988 Maurice Sedwell retired selling the business to his employee Andrew Ramroop. The business moved to 19 Savile Row in 1994.
Edward Sexton		1969	Edward Sexton		Men's tailors	Nutters of Savile Row was opened on Valentine's Day 1969 by Tommy Nutter and Edward Sexton, who had worked together at Donaldson, Williamson & Ward. Nutter left business in 1976, but Edward Sexton continues to run the business changing the name in 1982.
Ben Sherman		1963	Oxford Industries Inc.	5	British menswear brand	Founded by Arthur Benjamin Sugarman in Brighton, the business opened its first shop in the city in 1967. The business was purchased by Oxford Industries in 2004 from 3i and Enterprise Equities and discontinued the ladies' and children's wear ranges in 2010.
Shoe Zone		1917	Smith family	500	Footwear retailer	Originally called Bensonshoe, the business was first renamed to Discount Shoe Zone in 1996 before becoming Shoe Zone in 2001. In 2007 they purchased Shoefayre chain from Co-Op, and added the Stead & Simpson business after purchasing it from administrators in 2008.
Simply Be			N Brown group	15	Ladies' clothing and footwear	Online brand of N Brown Group, which opened its first physical shops in 2011. Dual branded shops with Jacamo.
Slaters		1973	Private limited company	25	Menswear	Founded in Glasgow, Scotland by Samuel Slater, the business is still owned by the Slater family.
John Smedley		1784	Private company	1	British designer knitwear	Founded as Lea Mills in 1784 by John Smedley and Peter Nightingale, it was in 1825 when John Smedley's son John took over the running of the business and started making clothing not just cloth. Operates a shop in Brook Street, London and concessions in several department stores.
Paul Smith		1970	Private company	17	Men's, children's and ladies' fashion brand	Founded by Paul Smith in Nottingham as Paul Smith Vêtements pour Hommes, a men's tailor. He opened his first shop in Covent Garden in 1979. The business now operates 17 shops in England.
Sock Shop		1983	Private company	1	Sock retailer	Founded as a specialist sock retailer by Sophie Mirman and Richard P. Ross. The business expanded to shops across the UK, US and Europe. However the business entered administration in 1990, and although was purchased by a consortium it struggled and after another period of administration it became part of the Facia group. This group failed in 1996, and between then and 2006 had a further three owners. The business had closed all of its shops but has since opened a shop in the Arndale Centre in Manchester and has concessions in various Mill outlets and department stores.
SOLETRADER		1962	Private company	40	Footwear retailer	Founded as Top Footwear for Men in St. Albans, the business changed its name to SOLETRADER in 1992.
Sports Direct		1982	Public limited company	470	Sportswear	Founded as Mike Ashley Sports in Maidenhead, the business changed its name to Preston Sports in 1984. In 1995–96 the business changed its name to Sports Soccer. In 2002 the business purchased rival Lillywhites, and in 2005 the business was again re-branded as Sports World, with a further change occurring in 2007 to Sports Direct. In 2012 it purchased the JJB brand name and 20 of it shops.
Steed Bespoke Tailors		1995	Private company	1	Men's bespoke tailors	Founded by Edward DeBoise and Thomas Mahon. Thomas Mahon left the business in 2002 and in 2008 Edward was joined by his son Matthew.
Store Twenty One		1932 2006	Private company	200	Men's, ladies' and childrenswear	Created by Grabal Alok, the Indian-owned textile manufacturer that had bought the remnants of QS Shops and Bewise chains that had gone into administration. In July 2016, it was proposed and agreed that a company voluntary arrangement should be taken. In May 2017 Store Twenty One entered administration for the second time due to poor trading. The company was placed into liquidation in July 2017 and all remaining stores closed.
Stowers Bespoke		2007	Private company	1	Men's bespoke tailors	Founded by Ray & Chris Stowers; Ray had previously worked for Gieves & Hawkes for 25 years.
Stradivarius		1994	Inditex Group	1	Womenswear	Founded as a family owned business in Barcelona, the business became part of the Inditex group in 1999. The first shop in the UK opened in Westgate, Stratford in 2014.
Sunspel		1860	Private company	7	British designer label	Sunspel was founded in 1860 as a manufacturer of clothing by Thomas Hill, and claims to be the first fashion retailer to produce the T-shirt style clothing top.
Superdry		1985	Public limited company		Men's, ladies' and children's fashion brand	Founded as Cult Clothing by Ian Hibbs and Julian Dunkerton in Cheltenham. During the 1990s the business expanded into a number of UK university towns and cities, before opening their first Superdry shop in Covent Garden in 2004.
Sweaty Betty		1998	Private company	32	Sportswear	Founded by Tamara and Simon Hill-Norton with one boutique in London's Notting Hill selling ladies' activewear, by 2003 the business had expanded to five shops.

=== T–Z ===
Clothing shops in UK	Image	Established in UK	Owned by	Number of shops	Type of shop	Notes
Tempest			Alexander family	11	Ladies' clothing and footwear	Young ladies' fashion shop located in Northern Ireland and owned by Menarys department store chain
Tesco		1919	Publicly traded on the London Stock Exchange	3561	Men's, children's and ladies' clothing and footwear	First started selling clothes in 1960.
Tessuti		1985	Private company		Menswear retailer	Founded as a luxury clothing menswear retailer in the North West of England, Fifty per cent of the business was purchased by JD Sports in 2012 who added five of their Cecil Gee branches to the chain.
Thresher & Glenny		1755	Private company	1	Tailors and shirtmakers	Founded in 1755 after a merger of older business. Operates in Middle Temple Lane, London.
Tiger of Sweden		1903	IC Group	1	Swedish menswear brand	Founded in the Swedish town of Uddevalla by Markus Schwarmann and Hjalmar Nordstrom, the business has been owned by IC Group since 2003. The business opened its first UK shop in 2013 in London. It also operates concessions within Selfridges department stores.
Timberland		1973	VF Corporation	34	Footwear and clothing manufacturer and retailer	Founded as a brand of The Abington Shoe Company in the US, the business opened its first UK retail shop in 1990 on New Bond Street, London.
TK Maxx		1976	TJX Companies	280	Men's, children's and ladies' clothing and footwear	Opened as TJ Maxx in Framingham, Massachusetts in 1976. Opened first UK shop in Bristol in 1994 under TK Maxx name to not confuse itself with discount department store TJ Hughes.
Toast			French Connection plc / Seaton Family	11	Men's and ladies' clothing and footwear	Started by Jessica and Jamie Seaton in Wales in 1997 as a mail order pyjama company. French Connection purchased 75% of the company in 2000.
Tod's		1920	Public company	2	Italian footwear retailer	Italian designer footwear retailer
Topshop		1964	Arcadia Group	300	Men's and ladies' clothing	Founded in 1964 as the young ladies' fashion department in the Peter Robinson department store. Split off from Peter Robinson as a separate business (by owners Burton Group) in 1973.
C J Townrow & Sons		1871	Private company	4	Department store	Department store founded in Braintree that now operates in Essex and Cambridgeshire.
Trespass		1984	Jacobs and Turner Ltd	150+	Outdoor clothing manufacturer and retailer	Founded by Jacobs & Turner, a workwear company operating since 1938, as a brand to move into specialist skiwear and outdoor clothing. The retail business was started in the 1990s.
Turnbull & Asser		1885	Ali Fayed	1	Men's shirtmaker	Founded in 1885 by Reginald Turnbull and Ernest Asser, a salesman, in St. James in West London. In 1903 they moved to their Jermyn Street location. The business was purchased by Ali Fayed younger brother of Mohamed Al-Fayed, former owner of Harrods, in 1986.
Tuxedo Junction		1995	Private company	2	Tailor and weddings	Founded in Gloucester and Cirencester.
Charles Tyrwhitt		1986	Private company	17	Men's outfitter	Founded as a mail order business by Nicholas Charles Tyrwhitt Wheeler, the business opened its first shop in Jermyn Street, London in 1997.
UGG Australia		1978	Deckers Outdoor Corporation	8	American footwear design brand	Founded by Brian Smith in California, the business was purchased by Deckers Outdoor Corporation in 1995.
Uniqlo		1949	Fast Retailing Ltd.	10	Japanese clothing retailer	UNIQLO is a clothing apparel company, which was founded in Yamaguchi, Japan, in 1949 as a textiles manufacturer. The company opened its first shop in the UK in 2001.
United Colours of Benetton		1965	Benetton Group S.r.l.	3	Designer brand	Designer brand started by Luciano Benetton in Treviso, which opened shops around the world. Currently only shops in Northern Ireland are operated by Benetton.
Urban Outfitters		1970	Public limited company	28	American fashion retailer	Founded in 1970 by Richard Hayne, Scott Belair, and Gabriel Tham-Morrobel, the American fashion chain opened its first UK shop in 1998.
USC		1989	Sports Direct	58	Men's and ladies' clothing	Opened as a sports retailer in Edinburgh. Bought by Sir Tom Hunter in 2004. Purchased fully by Sports Direct in 2012. Defunct retailer Republic merged into USC in 2013. Went into Administration in 2015. Business bought by a Sports Direct holding company Republic Retail Ltd in 2015
Anna Valentine		1986	Private company	1	London fashion house	London Fashion house founded as Robinson Valentine, named after its founders Antonia Robinson and Anna Valentine. When Antonia Robertson left the business the brand became Anna Valentine.
John Varvatos		1999	Lion Capital/John Varvatos	1	American designer brand	Founded by the former head of design at Calvin Klein & Ralph Lauren, the US designer brand opened its first UK shop in 2014 in Conduit Street.
Vero Moda		1987	Bestseller		Women's fashion brand	Founded in Denmark in 1987, the business owned by Bestseller opened its first UK standalone shop in Westfield Stratford in 2011.
Victoria's Secret		1977	L Brands	9	Lingerie retailer	Founded in America by Roy Raymond, the first UK shop opened in Bond Street in 2012, with its ninth shop opening in Reading in April 2015.
Vilebrequin		1971	Private company	5	French fashion brand	Founded by Fred Prysquel as a swimwear company in France, and was named after the French for crankshaft.
Viyella		1961	Austin Reed	7	Ladies' clothing	Originally a brand name for a wool and cotton mix, a Viyella fashion retail business was started by its parent company. Owned by Austin Reed since 2009.
Louis Vuitton		1854	LVMH	8	French designer brand	French designer brand started by Louis Vuttion as a maker of travel trunks. Its first shop opened in London in 1885.
Amanda Wakeley		1990	Private company	5	British designer brand	Founded by Amanda Wakeley in Chelsea as a boutique and brand, the business has since expanded its stand alone shops and operates concessions within Harvey Nicholls shops.
Wall London		1997	Private company	1	Ladies' fashion boutique	Founded by Hernán and Judith de Balcázar as a boutique in Notting Hill, London, the business expanded into mail order in 1999 and online sales in 2000.
Wallis		1923	Arcadia Group	400	Ladies' clothing	Founded by Raphael Nat Wallis in 1923. The business was purchased by Sears Group in 1980. Became part of Arcadia Group in 1999 following the Sears plc purchase by Sir Philip Green.
Weird Fish		1993	Private company	12	Men's, women's and childrenswear brand	Founded by Doug Tilling as a clothing manufacturer of artist T-shirts. In 1999 the business opened its first shops in Cardiff and Bath.
Welsh & Jefferies		1917	James Cottrell	1	Men's tailoring	Founded in 1917 on the high street of Eton and became an established military tailor.
Vivienne Westwood			Private company	12	British designer label	Founded by Vivienne Westwood after the break up of her partnership with Malcolm McClaren, the UK business was franchised to Hervia until 2013.
What Katie Did		1999	Private company	1	Ladies' lingerie	Founded by Katie Thomas by selling stockings, the brand first started as an online retailer before opening its first boutique in London's Portobello in 2003. The business now also operates a boutique in Los Angeles.
Whistles		1976	Private limited company	40	Ladies' clothing	Founded by Lucille Lewin. Bought by Mosaic Fashions in 2004. Sold to a business led by Jane Shepherdson in 2008.
Whitcomb and Shaftesbury		2004	Private company	1	Men's tailors	Founded by Indian brothers Mahesh and Suresh Ramakrishnan and named after the intersection of two nearby streets.
White Stuff		1985	Private company	85	Men's and women's fashion brand	Founded by George Treves and Sean Thomas as a clothing manufacturer aimed at skiers. The business changed focus away from the skying market and moved into selling their own goods. By 2014 they operated 85 shops and several concessions within the UK.
Jack Wills		1999	Jack Wills Ltd & Inflexion	69	Men's and ladies' clothing	Founded by Peter Williams and Robert Shaw at 22 Fore Street, Salcombe. Originally, it was heavily marketed towards university students, using the slogan and trademark "University Outfitters" to reflect the inspiration behind the brand. The "University Outfitters" slogan has slowly been replaced with the more favoured slogan "Fabulously British".
Wolford		1950	Public limited company	66	Lingerie retailer	Founded as a manufacturer of women's stockings in Austria. The business operates 66 stand alone shops, 10 shop in a shop and concessions in the UK.
Jack Wolfskin		1981	The Blackstone Group	7	Outdoor wear Manufacturer and retailer	Jack Wolfskin is a major German producer of outdoor wear and equipment headquartered in Idstein. It was founded in 1981 and is now owned by the American company The Blackstone Group. Up to now there are more than 600 Jack Wolfskin-Shops worldwide (mid-2012). Almost all of them are organized in a franchise system.
Wynsors World of Shoes		1980s	Courtesy Shoes Limited	40	Footwear retailer	Founded by Courtesy Shoes after opening a new shop in the former Wynsor House Discount Carpets shop in Thurcroft. The brand replaced all Courtsey Shoes former brand Medina Shoes.
YMC		1976	French Connection plc	2	Men's and ladies' clothing	Created as You Must Create (YMC) in 1995 by Fraser Moss and Jimmy Collins. French Connection purchased the business during the late 1990s.
Z Zegna		c.2000s	Ermenegildo Zegna	2	Italian designer brand	Founded by the Zegna family as a younger brand to the main Ermenegildo Zegna brand.
Zara		1975	Inditex	67	Men's, children's and ladies' clothing and footwear	Founded by Amancio Ortega in A Coruña, Galicia, Spain. Opened first UK shop in 1998.
Ermenegildo Zegna		1910	Ermenegildo Zegna	3	Italian designer brand	Founded as a maker of fabrics in Italy after Ermenegildo Zegna bought his father's mill.

== Defunct ==
Defunct clothing shops in UK	Image	Established in UK	Rebranded or closed	Notes	
Abbotts Phitt-Easy Ltd			1937	Chain of shoe shops based mainly in London. In 1937 the business was purchased by K Shoes, who completed a deal with Clarks and split the shops between them, with Clarks keeping eight. Clarks were not allowed to operate them under the Abbotts name, so chose the name Peter Lord. K Shoes operated the remaining shops under their own name.	
Adams Childrenswear		1933	2010	Founded by Amy Adams in Birmingham in 1933. Bought By Foster Brother Clothing Co in 1973. Fosters was purchased by Sears plc in 1983. In 1999 Sears was purchased by Sir Philip Green, and the Adams business was sold to a management buyout. The business went first into administration in 2006, being bought out by John Shannon. In 2008 Adams went into administration again and was brought out again by John Shannon. In 2009 the Adams business was sold to the investment group Habib Alvi. In 2010 the business went into administration for the third time and closed.	
Addley Bourne				Ladies' clothing warehouse of the 19th century, originally based in Piccadilly but then later 174 Sloane Square, London.	
Claude Alexander				Men's multiple tailor chain based in Scotland with 44 shops, who were bought by United Drapery Shops in 1951. Became part of UDS Tailoring group, along with John Collier and Alexandre Tailors.	
Alexandre Tailors		1906		Founded as a manufacturer in 1906 by Samuel Henry Lyons in Templar Lane, Leeds. In 1954 Alexandre was purchased from the family by UDS, with Lyon brothers Bernard and Jack taking on senior management roles at UDS before running the business. Alexandre became part of the UDS Tailoring group along with John Collier and Claude Alexander.	
W. A. Allery				19th-century tailors based in Soho Street, London.	
Allsports			2005	Chain of sports clothing shops started by David Hughes, which went into administration in 2005 with 267 shops – at the time the fourth largest sports chain. JD Sports purchased the business from the administrator, including the remaining open 177 shops, which they aimed to run as a separate business. However shops were either closed or eventually re-branded to JD Sports.	
Alpine Sports		c.1980s		Founded during the 1980s by JJB to concentrate on items for the climbing, hiking, and ski markets. Business was transferred to Blacks Leisure as part of the deal that saw Howard Sports join JJB. Eventually became part of First Sport chain.	
Amber Ladieswear				Former ladieswear shop located in Briggate, Leeds.	
Hardy Amies		1946	2008	Hardy Amies founded his fashion couture business in January 1946 in Savile Row. The business expanded into retail tailoring by selling its own branded goods. In 1973 the business was purchased by Debenhams, however Amies purchased the business back in 1981. In 2001 Luxury Brands Group purchased the business from Amies however by November 2008 it had gone into bankruptcy. The brand name was purchased by Fung Capital, but its 6 retail shops closed as they were not part of the purchase.	
Apple Tailoring		1966	1968	Dandie Fashions opened its shop at 161 King's Road, Chelsea in October 1966. In 1968 The Beatles invested in Dandie renaming it Apple Tailoring, but it closed several months later after not making a profit	
John Archbold				Footwear shop based in Boar Lane, Leeds during the 19th century.	
Arnold & Cordwell				19th-century tailors and outfitters based in North End, Croydon.	
Mike Ashley Sports		1982	1984	Founded by Mike Ashley in Maidenhead. In 1984 they changed the trading name to Preston Sports.	
Astral Sport & Leisure		1955	c.1980s	Founded in 1955, the sports retailer operated concessions within department stores. The business was purchased by House of Fraser in 1978 after getting into financial difficulty and expanded it to include stand alone branches. The business was purchased by Sears during the 1980s and incorporated into their Olympus chain.	
Harry Attwood				Clothing retailer owned by Great Universal Stores.	
Ethel Austin		1934	2013	Started in Liverpool by Ethel Austin from her front room. The business stayed in the family until 2002, when it was purchased by a management buyout. In 2004, the business was bought by ABN-AMRO Capital, however the business entered administration for the first time in 2008. It was purchased by former MK One boss Elaine McPherson in May 2008, but went again into administration in 2010. It was saved again by Ashloch Ltd in 2011, but they went into administration in 2012. The company was liquidated in January 2013.	
Austin the Tailor				National chain of men's tailors with shops from Dundee, Scotland to Basildon, England.	
Bacon Shoes			2009	Bacon Shoes was a subsidiary of Stylo plc and was dissolved in September 2009 after the collapse of its parent company.	
Baileys Menswear				Menswear shop based in Briggate, Leeds during the 1970s.	
James Baker				Small chain of shoe shops purchased by Clarks in 1977.	
Bambers				Ladies' fashion shop that expanded in the 1960s.	
Bank Shops		1994	2015	Founded by former Macclesfied footballer Andy Scott, the business was bought by JD Sports in 2007. In November 2014 the struggling business was sold to Hilco Capital, however in January 2015 the business was put into administration.	
Kate Barnes				Retailer of ladies' fashions based in Manchester Road, Burnley.	
Barnett-Hutton				Chain of ladieswear shops owned by department store chain Hide & Co. Was merged with Tootals shops to create the Van Allen chain.	
Baron of Piccadilly		1838	c.2010	Men's tailors based on Jermyn Street, London which closed due to the Eagle Place redevelopment by the Crown Estate. The business had been owned by Welsh firm Morris Cowan, owned by the father of actor Sacha Baron Cohen.	
Barrance & Ford		1881	1975	Ladies' tailors opened by Charles Barrance & Robert White Ford in Hastings. A further shop was added in Kings Road, Brighton in 1891. The Hastings shop became part of Plummer Roddis in the 1920s, while the Brighton shop continued until the 1970s.	
Barratts Shoes		1903	2013	Founded in Northampton, the business had grown to 150 branches by 1939. The business was purchased by Stylo in 1964, who rebranded their shops under the Barratts name. During the 1990s they merged with rival Priceless shoes, however in 2009 Stylo went into administration. 220 Barratts and Priceless shops were closed, with the remaining 160 shops and 165 concessions being bought by Barratts Priceless Ltd. This however went into administration in 2011, with Barretts Trading, another Michael Ziff vehicle purchasing 89 of Priceless and Barratts shops. This however went into administration in 2013, with 14 shops being sold to Pavers Shoes and the brand and website being sold to footwear entrepreneur Harvey Jacobsen. The Barratts name continues to operate online only.	
James Barrington				National fur chain shop.	
Barringtons				National men's tailor chain	
Bata Shoes			c.1980s	Founded in 1894 in Zlín, Moravia, by Tomáš Baťa, Bata opened a factory at East Tilbury in Essex with an attached workers town in 1932. Bata opened shops across the UK but grew largely after the Second World War when "British Bata" was born. Bata started closing their UK retail operations in the 1980s.	
Bay Trading Company		c.1990s	2009	Originally a privately owned company, the business was purchased by Alexon Group in 1999. The business was put into administration in 2009, with a small number of shops and name being purchased by the Rinku Group. These subsequently closed.	
Bayne & Duckett				Small chain of shoe shops operating in Scotland purchased by Clarks and incorporated under the Clarks name.	
Bazaar		1955	1969	Opened by Mary Quant, Plunket Greene and Archie McNair in Kings Road, London. Closed 1969	
Beale & Inman		1828	2007	London High End Tailors based at 131–132 New Bond Street, which was purchased by Cecil Gee during the 1970s. In 1988 it became part of Moss Brothers Group, after the merge of Cecil Gee and Moss Brothers. The business closed in 2007, with the shop being filled by Italian fashion house Corneliani.	
John T. Beer				Men's tailors located at the junction of Boar Lane with Briggate in Leeds during the 19th Century. Building was demolished in 1867.	
Benefit Shoes				Shoe retailer owned by the British Shoe Corporation.	
Bensonshoe		1917	1996	Founded in 1917, the business was acquired by the Smith family in 1980. The business purchased rival brand Tylers in 1986, before rebranding to Discount Shoe Zone in 1996.	
Berkertex		1936	1992	Founded by Leslie Berker as a clothing manufacturer, the business opened its first retail outlet within the Spooners department store in Plymouth. At one time they had over 2000 retail outlets. The business went into administration in 1992 before the manufacturing business was purchased by Bairds.	
Best Jeanswear		1990	1998	Founded in 1985 as Just Jeans, after 1990 the name was changed to Best Jeanswear. The Republic brand was launched in 1998.	
Bewise			2006	Discount homeware and clothing retailer. Went into administration 2006. Some shops were purchased by new chain Shop Twenty One.	
Biba		1964	1980	Biba started as a mail order business before opening their first shop in Kensington, London. The business opened further shops before creating Big Biba inside the former Derry & Toms department store in 1974. To help fund the business shares were sold to Dorothy Perkins, whose parent British Land saw the business worth less than the property. In 1975 the shop was closed, and the trademark sold off and used by a new business based in Mayfair from 1978 to 1980. Now owned by House of Fraser as one of their in house designer brands.	
The Big Label		2009		Formerly QS Discount, owned by QS Shops. Owned five shops in Blackburn, Sale, Atherton, Warrington and Chorley.	
Bissington		19th century	1935	Hatter and hosier that was based in Briggate, Leeds.	
William Blackburn & Co		1867	c.1960s	Founded in Leeds as a men's clothing manufacturer, they share the honour with Hepworths of being the first to open retail outlets to market its products. The business expanded to 30 shops and closed in the early 1960s.	
Blades		1962		Blades was a London fashion boutique established in 1962 by Rupert Lycett Green.Blades moved to Burlington Gardens in 1967, where the shop windows looked down on Savile Row itself.[1] The premises are now occupied by the tailors Ede & Ravenscroft.	
Blazer			2000	Menswear shop created by Shophouse plc, which was purchased by Moss Brothers in 1996. The chain was merged into its newly formed brand Code, in 2000, however by 2002 the Code brand had failed and Blazer returned as a clothing only brand within the Moss Brothers and Cecil Gee shops.	
J. E. Bloom & Co				19th-century boys' outfitter based in High Holborn, London.	
A. Booth and Sons				Men's tailors that operated at 143 Briggate, Leeds.	
Boxfresh		1989		Boxfresh is a clothing label which opened its own boutique in Covent Garden in 1992. Still operating as a clothing label but no longer as a retailer.	
W.Bradley				Furriers who were based in Dale Street, Manchester.	
Bradleys of Chester				Men's outfitters originally based in Chester	
Brantano		1953	2017	Founded in Belgium as a manufacturer of ladies' shoes, the UK business opened in 1998 after the purchase of the British Shoe Corporation's 47 Shoe City shops. Closed in 2017 after owners Alteri put the business into administration for the second time.	
Bricks Manshop				Chain of menswear shops that was taken on by sons Brian and Alex Brick, who rebranded the business as Suits You and sold their retail business SRG in 2005 for £30m. The business was purchased by Egyptian group Arafa Holdings in 2008. However the 66 shop business entered administration in October 2010, 12 of the shops were purchased by the former owners and re-opened as Suit Direct.	
British Home Stores		1928	2016	Founded in 1928 by American Entrepreneurs in Brixton to take on Woolworths. Business went public in 1933, and became part of Shophouse plc in 1986 after merging with Habitat and Mothercare. Went private again in 2000 after purchase by Sir Philip Green, who transferred the business to his Arcadia Group. Sold in 2015 to Retail Acquisitions for a nominal £1, the business entered administration in 2016 before closing.	
Albert Brooks			1891	19th-century milliner and fancy draper based in London at Westminster Bridge that was declared bankrupt in 1891.	
Brooks Brothers		2006		Founded as H. & D. H. Brooks & Co. in Manhattan, US, was rebranded Brooks Brothers after founder Henry's sons took charge of the business. From 1988 to 2001 the business was owned by Marks and Spencers. In 2006 the business opened its first UK shop in Old Broad Street, London.	
Bus Stop		1968	1979	Bus Stop was a young girls' fashion boutique fronted by designer Lee Bender. It was seen as a cheaper alternative to Biba and opened its first shop in Kensington, London. It had 11 stores in total across the UK including Newcastle-Upon-Tyne, Southampton, Bristol and Edinburgh. Citing bad weather leading to a decline in sales, it went into receivership in 1979.	
C&A		1841	2001	Founded in Holland as a textile manufacturer, opening their first shop in Amsterdam in 1906. Opened first UK shop in 1922. Closed UK operations in 2001 due to competition. Still operate in mainland Europe and Latin America.	
Cable & Co				Shoe retailer owned by the British Shoe Corporation. When Sears broke up the corporation during the 1990s, Cable was sold to the United States company Nine West.	
Calders Menswear		Early 20th Century	2013	Menswear shop based in Cardiff. Owned by the father of Sacha Baron Cohen along with Barons of Piccadilly in London and Morris Cowan in Newport. The company went into liquidation in December 2013.	
Calverts of Runcorn				Fashion & Haberdashery shop based in Runcorn.	
Camping and Caravanning Centre		1969	2004	Founded as the Camping & Caravaning Centre in Sheffield, the business began renaming itself Go Outdoors from 2004.	
Capstick & Hamer				Retailer and manufacturer of Furs based in North Parade, Bradford and Albert Road, Morecambe.	
Cargo Club		c.1990s		A British version of Costco run by Nurdin & Peacock at 3 sites in Croydon, Birmingham and Bristol. The operation was closed due to lack of membership renewals and shops purchased by Sainsburys.	
Cash Clothing of Leicester				Men's outfitters that expanded between the 1890s and the WW1.	
Champion Sports			1993	Chain of Sports shops created by Burton Group. Purchased by Cobra Sports in 1993.	
Chanelle				Chain of ladies' fashion shops owned by department store group J J Allen.	
M. Chapman				19th-century merchant tailors based on the London Road, near the Elephant & Castle, London.	
Chas.Baker & Co		1864	1939	Gentlemen's and boys' outfitters that opened in Seven Sisters in 1864 and expanded across London until the business collapsed in 1939 with the start of the war.	
Cheapjacks				National clothing retailer owned by Peter Millett Group, which closed in the 1990s with the collapse of the parent company.	
The Chelsea Cobbler		1967		Opened in Chelsea by Richard Smith, Amanda Wilkins and George Macfarlane. The business slowly expanded with shops opening in the West End and Harrods. In 1976 the business was bought by rival Rayne, who was purchased by Debenhams in 1978. The business was sold on by Burtons in 1987 before becoming part of US group Nine West in 1993. The Chelsea Cobbler brand was relaunched in 2009 by Dune, with three shops opening, however these have since closed or rebranded and the name is only a range sold by Dune.	
Chelsea Girl		1965	1991	Founded by Bernard Lewis under the name Lewis Separates, the business changed name to Chelsea Girl in 1965. In 1988 it merged with its menswear operation Concept Man to form River Island, with all shops rebranded by 1991.	
Chilli Pepper			2011	Teenage aimed fashion shop which went into administration in 2011.	
Ciro Citterio			2005	Menswear chain that purchased rvials Horne Brothers, Oakland Menswear and Dunn & Co, that went into administration several times with the chain finally collapsing in May 2005.	
Clobber		1964		Founded by Jeff Banks in Blackheath and showcased design by Ossie Clark and Mary Quant amongst others, the business expanded by opening concessions within Fenwicks Newcastle shop and supplying Bloomingdales in the United States. Jeff Banks sold the business in 1969 to start his own Fashion Label.	
Clysdale Rubber Company		1870	1930	Founded as a retailer of raincoats, in 1930 William Greaves took over the business and turned it into a multi sports shop operating under the Greaves Sports name.	
Cobra Sports			2000	Family owned chain that was purchased by JD Sports in 2000.	
Code		2000	2002	Created by Moss Brothers to take on the menswear casual market. Code stood for "Casualwear, Office, Dressing up, and Essentials", The business took on shops from the Savoy Taylors Guild & Blazer brands, however it failed and was closed down in 2002.	
Coles		1946	1993	Chain of menswear shops that was wound up in 1993.	
John Collier		1958	1985	Created by United Drapery Shops in 1958 by renaming Fifty Shilling Tailors. Was purchased by Hanson as part of UDS in 1983. A short lived management buyout saw the name changed to plain Collier before being sold on to Burtons in 1985, with the brand being discontinued.	
Concept Man		1982	1991	Concept Man was a menswear operation, the brother of Chelsea Girl and opened in 1982. The business was merged in 1988 to form River Island, with all shops re-branded by 1991.	
Contessa Lingerie			2006	National lingerie change purchased by disgraced financier Stephen Hinchliffe for his failed business Facia. After the collapse of Facia, Theo Paphitis bought the business in 1996. In 2006 he sold Contessa along with his other underwear firm La Senza UK to Lion Capital, who merged Contessa shops into La Senza.	
Courtesy Shoes		1956		Courtesy Shoes started as a small trader on market stalls, before moving into shops. in the 1960s the business bought Lees of Leeds and Seftons, small footwear chains based in Yorkshire and changed the operating name to Medina Shoes. Courtesy Shoes continues to be the parent company's name and currently operates under the Wynsors World of Shoes name.	
Morris Cowan		c.1950s	2012	Men's tailors based in Queen Street, Cardiff & Commercial Street, Newport. Business also owned the London establishment Barons of Piccadilly.	
R Crabb & Co				19th-century merchant tailors and outfitters based in Westminster Bridge Road, London.	
Crazy Jeans		c.1980s		Small jeans chain in Bristol and Bath that based its operation on London business Dickie Dirts.	
W. Creamer & Co				Furrier that was based in Bold Street, Liverpool.	
Cresta Shops			1979	Chain of ladieswear shops started by former Berkertex director Eric Crabtree. At one time it had 71 shops and was the largest high-class fashion chain in the world. Purchased by Debenhams, it was closed as a stand-alone business in 1979.	
Cripps, Sons & Co		c.19th century	c.1970s	Ladies' dressmakers based in Bold Street, Liverpool. The building was commissioned by John Cripp in 1860. The business closed down during the early 1970s.	
Cromwells Madhouse / Madhouse		1971	2012	Founded in 1971, the jeans retailer expanded by the millennium to 56 shops in the South East and the Midlands. In 2004 the business was bailed out by Sports Direct, who sold the business onto Melvyn Reiss and Stephen Mucklow. They put the business into administration in 2009, buying the business back in a pre-packed deal. The name was changed to just Madhouse, but it went into administration again in 2012.	
John Cruickshank & Co.				19th-century outfitters based in Shaftesbury Avenue, London.	
Cult Clothing		1985	2004	Founded by Ian Hibbs and Julian Dunkerton in Cheltenham, the business expanded during the 1990s in a number of UK university towns and cities. The business opened its first Superdry shop in Covent garden in 2004, and all Cult Clothing shops were renamed.	
Curtess Shoes			1997	Founded by Harry Levison, the business was purchased by Freeman, Hardy Willis in 1954 Fortress was renamed to Curtess Shoes by Levison, who was given management of the British Shoe Corporation by Charles Clore. In 1996 Sears sold Curtess to entrepreneur Stephen Hinchliffe and his business Facia. A year later the business collapsed along with the rest of Hinchliffe's business empire.	
d2 Jeans			2011	Men's and ladies' fashion shop started by Sir Tom Hunter. Went into administration twice, in 2009 and 2011. 20 shops were purchased in 2011 by Blue Inc.	
Damart		1953		Founded in France as a manufacturer of thermal clothing, the UK retail operations have now closed with only online sales now available to UK customers.	
Dandie Fashions		1966	1968	Dandie Fashions opened its shop at 161 King's Road, Chelsea in October 1966. In 1968 The Beatles invested in Dandie renaming it Apple Tailoring.	
Dapper Women			2011	Designer boutique based in St Nicholas Street and Huntriss Row, Scarborough that closed in 2011.	
Dash		1982		Fashion brand started in 1982, which at one time operated shops and concessions across the UK.	
Geoffrey Davis				Small menswear shop in Golders Green, London which was owned by David Gold, of Carnaby Street Lord John fame.	
Dorothy Dearnaley				Ladies' clothing shop that was located on Newport Street, Bolton.	
Designer Rooms			2010	Ladies' fashion brand with 10 shops put into liquidation in 2010.	
Dickie Dirts		c.1970s		Founded in an old cinema in Fulham by Nigel Wright, the jeans retailer started the parallel importing business in the UK. The business expanded to have shops in Camberwell, Westbourne Grove, and Stratford.	
Discount Shoe Zone		1917	2001	Founded as Bensonshoe in 1917, the business changed its name to Discount Shoe Zone in 1996. The business changed its name again in 2001 to Shoe Zone.	
Dixon Sports			2002	North East Based sports retailer who went into liquidation in 2002, with 6 of the shop being purchased by Gilesports, including its shop in the Gateshead Metro Centre.	
George Doland				Chain of tailor shops established in the South West of London, which grew into a National Chain.	
Dolcis Shoes		1863	2008	The company began life on a street barrow in 1863 when John Upson started to sell his shoes on Woolwich Town Market, opening its first shop in Woolwich as the Great Boot Provider. Dolcis name appeared above the door during the 1920s. Owned by Sears since the 1950s, the business was sold off by them in 1998. Went into administration in 2008.	
Dormie				Menswear retailer purchased by Moss Bros in 1992.	
Dunn & Co.		1887	1996	Dunn & Co. was founded in 1887 by George Arthur Dunn, a Quaker, who started by selling hats on the streets of Birmingham. In 1991 the business was in trouble and sold to Hodges, but in 1994 a majority stake was sold to venture capitalists CinVen. This was short lived and in 1996 the business was purchased by Citto Citterio.	
Kenneth Durward				Coat shop based in Conduit Street, London. Became part of the Aquascutum group.	
Easiephit				Retail name of Greenlees & Sons, a shoe manufacturer based in Leicester.	
Peter Eastwood				Men's outfitters based in 61 Vicar Lane, Leeds.	
J Edwards & Sons		1830	2015	Footwear shop located in Deansgate, Manchester as well as Guildhall Street, Preston (previously R. Jamieson). Business closed suddenly in 2015 with no explanation. In its latter years it was associated with the firm Christmas & Clemence of Bolton and Southport	
Eisenegger			2005	Discount men's fashion shop started c.1990s. Went into administration in 2005 and closed.	
Elangol				Chain of 160 shops which has Eastex shops within them.	
Elisabeth of Colne				Ladies' boutique based in Colne, Lancashire during the 1950s.	
Enoch Edge				Shoe shop based in King Street, Lancaster during the 1950s, with the grand title of Shoe Fitters.	
Envy		1960	2010	Founded in 1960, the menswear chain was purchased by John Kinnaird from Alexon Retail in February 2008, before he completed a pre-package deal with his new vehicle Envy Retail Ltd in Dec 2008. In 2010 John Kinnaird sold the business to a consortium of private equity investors including the boss of SKG Capital, Chris Althorp-Gormlay, however the business was put into administration a month later and all 18 shops were closed.	
Etam		1916	2005	Founded by Max Lindemann in 1916, the UK and French Etams were separate companies until the French Etam Developpement purchased Etam UK from Stanley Lewis and his family for £97m in 1997. Purchased by Philip Green's Arcadia group, with shops converted to Arcadia brands or closed. Since 2011 the Etam brand has returned to the UK.	
Faith		1964	2010	Started by Samuel Faith and his wife, the business grew to 72 stand alone shops and separate concessions in many of Britains department store chains. In 2004 the Faith family sold the business to Bridgepoint Capital, but entered administration in 2008 before being purchased by John Kinnaird. The business again entered administration in 2010, with all shops closing. Debenhams bought the Faith brand and all the 115 concessions within their shops.	
The Famous Brunswick Warehouse			2003	Brand name of a chain of shoe warehouses operated by North Shoes. The business was purchased by Brown & Jackson, the owners of Poundstretcher in 1999, before all 27 shops becoming part of Brantano in 2003.	
Famous Army Stores		1981	2002	Outdoor clothing and camping equipment shops based in Garston, Liverpool, UK. After a management buyout in 1996, rapidly grew from 100 to 200 shops before going into administration in 2002. 47 shops were purchased by Blacks Leisure but the name was discontinued.	
John Farmer			c.1980s	Family owned footwear multiple which was bought by UDS in 1982. Hanson sold the near 100 strong chain to Clarks during the breakup of UDS. In the late 1980s the brand was incorporated into Clarks and shops were re-branded or closed.	
Fenchurch		2000	2011	Started as a clothing brand. In 2005 the brand opened its first shop in Covent Garden, London. In 2011 the business went into administration, and the business was purchased by JD Sports.	
Harry Fenton			1984	Men's tailors chain, loved by the mods in the 1960s. In 1980 footballer Kevin Keegan fronted the advertising campaign for the chain. The business was sold by its owner, Combined English Shops in 1984 to the Burton Group who converted or closed shops.	
Fifty Shilling Tailors		1905		Founded in Leeds by Henry Price of Price Tailors Ltd. Business had over 399 shop in the UK. Was purchased by United Drapery Shops in 1954 and the shop was rebranded John Collier.	
First Sport		1988	2002	Chain of 187 sports shops created by Blacks Leisure by merging its purchased sports shops. It was purchased by JD Sports in 2002.	
E Fletcher of Rochdale				Ladies' outfitters based in Rochdale during the 1950s.	
Flip		c.1970s	1985	Importer of American vintage clothing that operated three shops in London – Convent Garden, Kings Road and Shoeditch. Closed in 1985.	
Martin Ford				Ladies' clothing retailer that operated during 60s and 70s	
Forever 21		2010		American chain opened in 1984 as Fashion 21. First UK shop opened 2010.	
Fortress Shoe Company				Founded by Harry Levison, the business was purchased by Freeman, Hardy Willis in 1954 Fortress was renamed to Curtess Shoes by Levison, who was given management of the British Shoe Corporation by Charles Clore. In 1996 Sears sold Curtess Shoes to entrepreneur Stephen Hinchliffe and his business Facia. A year later the business collapsed along with the rest of Hinchliffe's business empire.	
Foster Brothers		1876	1998	Founded in Birmingham in 1876 as Foster Brothers Clothing company. Purchased Adams Childrenswear in 1973. Firm sold to Sears plc in 1983. Name changed to Fosters Trading Company. Sold by Sears to d2 Jeans in 1998.	
Freeman, Hardy and Willis		1875	1997	The shoe retailer was established in 1875 and was named after three employees of the company. In 1929 it was purchased by Sears and became part of its subsidiary the British Shoe Corporation. In 1996 the British Shoe Corporation converted half of the 540 FHM branches into Hush Puppies, selling the remaining off to an entrepreneur Stephen Hinchliffe and his business Facia. A year later the business collapsed along with the rest of Hinchliffe's business empire.	
Herbie Frogg		1969		Men's Tailors opened in 1969 and were based in Jermyn Street, London.	
Frontier Shoes		2003		Founded by former Famous Brunswick and Cobra Sports boss Mark Blackburn in 2003, the shoe shop chain had at its height five shops. In 2007 Mark Blackburn sold the business to Mark Turner, however the shops have since closed.	
Furmans Shoes				Northern based chain of shoe shops.	
Gamlen Brothers				19th-century outfitters based in Devonport, Devon.	
Gardiner & Co.				19th-century men's outfitters based in Commercial Road and Whitechapel, London.	
Cecil Gee		1929	2012	Founded in 1929 by Cecil Gee as a menswear retailer, the business merged with Moss Brothers in 1988. In 2012 Moss Brothers sold the remaining eight shops to JD Sports for £1.7 million. JD Sports renamed the shops under the Tessuti brand later in 2012.	
Gelert		1970	2013	Founded in Bryncir in Gwynedd, the outdoor clothing and camping business was named the dog Gelert of Prince Llywelyn the Great, who was Prince of Gwynedd. The business went into administration in 2013 and was purchased by Sports Direct. It now operates as a brand only within the Sports Direct empire.	
Genesis		1990	1992	Ladies' casual wear chain started by Berkertex, which was incorporated into Windsmoor by Bairds after they purchased the brand out of administration in 1992.	
Ghinns Ltd		1889		Founded in 1889 as a drapery shop in Peckham Rye. Became incorporated in 1933. Operated as Ghinns Wools – a wool and ladieswear shop. Purchased by McGeochs in 1970.	
Gilesports		1925	2006	Founded by Henry C Giles in 1925, and expanded to cover shops across Wales, the South West and the Midlands. In 2002 Gilesport bought 6 shops of Dixon Sports based in the North East. In 2006 the 80 shop chain was purchased by Sports World International for a deal worth £10m.	
Gio-Goi		2005	2013	Founded as a fashion brand in 1988, the business closed due to a legal challenge by Giorgio Armani over the name. The name was relaunced in 2005, with Pentland group buying 20 per cent in 2008. The first retail shop was opened in Union Square, Aberdeen in 2010. The business went into administration in 2013 and was purchased by JD Sports, where it became a brand only.	
Glass and Black		c.1960s	c.1960s	Founded by fashion designer Kiki Byrne, initially in Sloane Square, London before moving to Kings Road. During the mid-1960s the business shut after its purchase by Jaegar.	
Goldrange		1970s		Factory outlet shop in Petticoat Lane founded by Warren & David Gold of Lord John (Carnaby Street) fame. Replaced by The Big Red Building.	
Granditer Menswear		1910	1992	Founded by Morris Granditer as a small tailoring shop in Canning Town, London. By the 1970s the menswear name had been dropped and shops selling men's fashion had opened up across London. In 1992 the name was changed to Base.	
Granny Takes a Trip		1966	1979	Granny Takes a Trip was a boutique opened in February 1966 at 488 Kings Road, Chelsea, London, by Nigel Waymouth, his girlfriend Sheila Cohen and John Pearse.In late 1969, Cohen and Waymouth sold the business to London fashion entrepreneur Freddie Hornik, who had previously worked at Chelsea's Dandie Fashions. Shops were open in New York & Los Angeles. The London shop closed in 1979.	
Great Eastern Clothing Depot				19th-century outfitters and tailors run by James Peters from Shoreditch, London.	
Griffith Brothers		c.1890s	c.1930s	Menswear outfitters started in the 19th century in Brentford, and had 22 branches by 1928.	
J. H. Grimwade & Sons				Ipswich Tailors located on The Cornhills and was an agent for Jaegar.	
Edward Grove				19th-century tailors based in Lower Marsh, Lambeth, London.	
Hammells				Ladies' retailer of the 1970s and 80s that specialised in larger sizes	
Hanan-Gingell Shoe Company		1888		The retail arm of the Hanan Shoe Company, which opened in 1888 and was based at 328–332 Oxford Street, London.	
C.J. Hardy and Co				Outfitters based in Boar Lane, Leeds during the 1930s.	
Hargreaves Sports				Sports shop group based in South East that was purchased by Sports Direct.	
Hartley				Retail chain based in north of England purchased by Parkash Singh Chima along with Wiltex to form Bonmarché.	
Ann Harvey			2011	Chain of shops and concessions selling plus sized ladies' clothing. In 2011 owner Jacques Vert closed the retail business and concentrated on concessions, before closing the business completely in 2013. The name was revived by Bonmarche as a range within their shops in 2014	
Hawes & Sons				Ipswich clothing shop based in Tacket Street prior to the widening of the road.	
C. Hayman		c.1852		Ladies' and girls' 19th-century dressmakers based in Newington Causeway, London.	
Alan Hayton Boy's Shop				Boys' outfitters based at 115 Deansgate, Bolton. The business was struck of the companies register in 1975.	
Elizabeth Hebden				Ladieswear shop which was based in Manchester Road, Nelson.	
Henderson Sports				Chain of sport shops purchased by J M Millets during the 1970s.	
Henri Gowns			1975	Gown manufacturer that retailed their wares from a showroomm at 39/42 New Bond Street, London and was wound up in 1975.	
Joseph Hepworth & Son		1864	1984	Founded in Leeds by Joseph Hepworth & James Rhodes and became Britain's largest clothing manufacturer. Started selling from retail shops in the 1880s. Purchased Kendall & Sons in 1982, and in 1983 relaunched Kendalls under the Next brand. In 1984 all Hepworth shops were rebranded Next.	
Higgs Leather		1934	2017	Founded by James William Higgs in London, the business was moved to Westcliff on Sea before opening in Southend-on-Sea in 1969. Announced that the shop would close in 2017, however they would continue to operate online.	
Hilton Shoes				Founded by Stephen Hilton as a manufacturer and retailer in Leicester, by 1892 he had 40 shops. The business was purchased by Olivers and incorporated into the Oliver group.	
T. Hinde & Son				Ladies' show shop based in Manchester and Liverpool	
Hipps		c.1900	c.1970s	Founded in Leeds in the early 1900s, by 1914 it had 70 shops nationwide selling menswear. By 1932 it had 100 shops and was the fourth largest of the multiple tailors. In 1960 was purchased by Headrow Clothes, a rival manufacturer, who in turn was purchased by Great Universal S in 1962. Hipps was run as an independent group within Great Universal until its closure during the early 1970s.	
Hodges & Sons		c.19th century	1994	Founded in South Wales as a tailors. In 1991 purchased national chain Dunn & Co however this was short lived and in 1994 the business was sold to venture capitalists CinVen, with Hodges shops being rebranded under the Dunn name.	
Holbourne (Fashions) Ltd			1940	Ladies' outfitters based in Old Bond Street & High Holborn, London, as well as shops in Plymouth and Portsmouth. The business was wound up in 1940.	
Hope Brothers			c.1970s	Founded by Thomas Peacock as a shirt manufacturer in Littleport. The business expanded becoming a multiple tailor, purchasing high end London chain Howard Powe in 1954. The business was purchased by Great Universal Stores during the 1950s and was converted into the Just Pants Plus business during the 1970s.	
Horne Brothers		1886	2011	Founded in London as a tailors, it had by 1938 15 branches and a factory at 45–65 King Edward Road in Cambridge Heath, London. In 1987 the business was purchased by Sears. However, in the 1990s it was sold to Ciro Citterio, whom went into administration in the early 2000s. The business was purchased by several owners, however finally closed with 37 branches in 2011.	
House				Brand created by Cromwells Madhouse to sell more upmarket clothing.	
House of Holland			c.1980s	South of England-based discount department store went into administration late 80s.	
Howard Sports				Chain of 11 north west based sport shops purchased by JJB from Blacks Leisure in 1988. Part of the deal saw Alpine Sports go to Blacks.	
Thomas Howell				19th-century ladies' outfitters based in Kennington Cross, London	
Howies		1995	2011	Founded in Wales as a manufacturer of eco-friendly clothing, the business operated a shop in Carnaby Street until December 2011. Continues to operate as a manufacturer.	
Hung on You		c.1960s	1966	Hung on You was a London fashion boutique, run by the designer Michael Rainey, particularly known for flowery shirts and kipper ties in bold colours. Rainey's customers included the Rolling Stones, the Beatles, the Kinks and the actor Terence Stamp. The business closed in 1966 when the lease was sold.	
Hunt & Winterbotham				Woollen clothing manufacturer that started in c.1800, and opened its own boutique in Old Bond Street, London.	
Benjamin Hyam & Co				Clothing manufacturer and outfitter that was based in Oxford Street, London with branches in Birmingham, Wolverhampton, Leeds and Dewsbury. David Lewis, who started Lewis department store did his apprenticeship with Hyams.	
I Was Lord Kitchener's Valet		1966	1977	Founded by Ian Fisk and John Paul at 293 Portobello Road, Notting Hill, London. Among the shop's customers were Eric Clapton, Mick Jagger John Lennon and Jimi Hendrix. Further shops opened in Carnaby Streer, Piccadilly and Kings Road during 1967. Partnership dissolved in summer 1967, and Portebello Road shop became Injun Dog head-shop. Last I Was Lord Kitchener's Valet shop closed in 1977.	
The International Fur Shop				19th century furriers based at 163 & 198 Regents Street, London.	
Internacionale		1980	2014	Founded as a retail business in 1980 by Ken Cairnduff, the business grew into the name Internacionale. Went into administration for a third time in 2014 and closed. The name was purchased by Edinburgh Woollen Mills.	
Ipswich Boot & Shoe Warehouse				19th century retailer, with branches in Chelmsford and Halstead.	
Italian Suit Company			2014	Formal menswear retail chain that went into liquidation in 2014.	
The Ivy Shop		1965	1995	Founded in Richmond, London by John Simmons, the man who is widely recognised as coining the term Harrington for the Baracuta G9 jacket, The shop closed in January 1995 after being known as the home of Ivy League college boy look.	
Edmund Jackson				Menswear retailer that was based in the Market buildings in Vicar Lane, Leeds.	
Jackson the Tailor		1906	c.1970s	Founded in 1906 by M. Jackson in Newcastle as a manufacturer of menswear and branched out into retail. Merged with larger rival Burtons in 1954. At one time it had 550 shops across the UK. The shops were integrated into Burtons during the 1970s.	
Jonathan James		1973	2012	Mansfield based shoe retailer that closed its branches in December 2012.	
R. Jamieson				Footwear retailer based in Guildhall Street, Preston taken over by J. Edwards & Sons.	
Jaymax				Northern clothing chain with nine shops founded by John Hargreaves, who later went on to create Matalan.	
Jays				Clothing retailer owned by Great Universal Stores.	
Jean Jeanie				Chain of 65 shops saved by Sir Philip Green in 1985 for £65,000. Six months later he sold the business to Lee Cooper for £3m.	
Jean Junction				Founded in 1971 by Thomas Lonsdale on the corner of Kings Road and Chelsea Manor Street, London. Lonsdale bought jeans over from California, against the wishes of local wholesalers. The shop expanded into the UK's first chain of denimwear shops.	
JJB Sports		c.1900	2009	The original JJB sports shop was established by John Jarvis Broughton in the early 1900s and later was purchased by John Joseph Bradburn. It was expanded and incorporated in 1971, when ex-footballer and supermarket chain operator Dave Whelan acquired a single sports shop in Wigan and immediately opened a second sports goods outlet in his Sutton, St Helens, supermarket. In 1994 the business was floated, and in 1998 it bought its rival Sports Division. By 2005 the business had 430 shops, and in 2007 Dave Whelan sold his last shares to Icelandic financial group Exista and Chris Ronnie. In 2009 the business was put into administration and closed.	
Johnsons				Men's boutique based in Kensington and World's End.	
Johnsons the Modern Outfitter		1978	2000	Boutique clothing shop founded by Lloyd Johnson.	
J Jones				Costumier and furrier based that was based in Boar Lane, Leeds.	
Just Add Water				Chain of ten outdoor clothing shops purchased by Blacks in 2003	
Just Jeans		1985	1998	Founded in 1985 as Just Jeans, after 1990 the name changed to Best Jeanswear. The Republic brand was launched in 1998.	
Just Pants Plus		1970s		Chain created by Great Universal Stores by rebranding several of their traditional chains, including Hope Brothers.	
K Shoes		1842	c.1990s	Founded by Robert Miller Somervell as a shoemaking accessories merchant and leather factory in Kendall, Cumbria, the business grew into a manufacturing company called Somervell Brothers in 1848. The K brand was created as uppers and soles were being put together at home by workers, who some had been subsidising materials. Because of this each sole was marked, but instead of S for sole, someone picked up the K stamp. During the 1930s the company took on several failing retail agents, but it was not until the purchase and splitting up of Abbotts in 1937, did the K Shoe Shop appear. By 1980 the business had 230 branches in the UK, and agreed to a merger with Clarks in 1981 to starve off a takeover from another company. During the 1990s the K Shoe Shop brand was closed down due to tightening financial worries.	
Karrimor		1997	1999	Started as the retail arm of outdoor clothing firm Karrimor International. When Karrimor International was sold by its owners 21 Invest in 1999, the retail firm was retained and renamed Mountain Warehouse.	
Keevan				Men's outfitters based in London, with the shop famously being in the background of the Kinks' "Come Dance with Me" video filmed at Hornsey Street, London in 1983.	
Kendall & Sons Ltd		1870	1983	Started in 1870 as an umbrella manufacturer, before moving into rainwear and ladies' clothing ranges in the 20th century. Purchased by Combined English Shops in 1977, and sold to Joseph Hepworth & Son in 1982. Rebranded and relaunched as Next in 1983.	
King, Malcolm & Co				Retailer and manufacturer of Waders and Waterproof coats in Victorian Britain, based in Leicester Square, London.	
Kookai		1983	2013	Started as a fashion label in France. UK franchise (owned by Forminster) went into administration in 2006 with 25 shops and 30 concessions. Was bought by Kookai's parent company Groupe Vivarte. In 2013 the parent company decided to close its UK business.	
J. B. Ladbury				19th-century ladies' costumier based in Borough and Islington, London.	
Lady Jane		1966		First ladies' fashion boutique opened in Carnaby Street.	
John Laing				Menswear chain based in the north of England.	
John Laing & Co				Dumfries and Carlisle-based chain of footwear shops.	
Lane & Robinson				A shoe shop based in Whiteladies Road, Bristol which was purchased by Clarks in 1935.	
Lavand		2008		Spanish clothing brand that opened its first UK shop in London in 2013. Business now operates online in the UK.	
George H. Lavey & Company		1882		Men's tailors founded in 1882. Bought by A. C. Millett & Co (Millets) in 1964.	
LD Mountain Centre		1966		Founded by Peter Lockey and Gordon Davison as LD Mountain Centre in Newcastle upon Tyne. In 1972 they launched their own brand of clothing called Berghaus to sell in their shop. In 1993 Pentland Group purchased the business.	
Le Pop				1980s ladies' retailer.	
Lee Brothers (Overwear) Ltd				1950s ladies' outfitters based in Conduit Street, London.	
Lees of Leeds				Small chain of footwear shops located in Leeds area, purchased by Courtesy Shoes in the 1960s and rebranded under the Medina Shoes brand.	
Lewis & Co				19th-century ladies' costumiers based in Westminster Bridge Road, London and Croydon.	
Lewis Separates		1947	1965	Founded by Bernard Lewis under the name Lewis Separates, the business changed name to Chelsea Girl in 1965. In 1988 it merged with its menswear operation Concept Man to form River Island, with all shops being re-branded by 1991.	
Lilley & Skinner		1835	2008	Thomas Lilley opened his first shoe shop in Southwark, London in 1835. In 1881 William Banks Skinner joined the firm and the business name changed to Lilley & Skinner. In 1953 the business merged with rival the Saxone Shoe Company, however the business was purchased by Sears owned British Shoe Corporation in 1962. During the 1990s Sears broke up and sold off the shoe brands it owned, with Lilley & Skinner being purchased by Stead & Simpson. However Stead & Simpson went into administration in 2008 and was purchased by Shoe Zone which converted shops to their branding or closed them.	
Littlewoods		1932	2005	Founded as a football pools company in 1923 by John Moores, the business expanded into mail order retailing in 1932. The first shop opened in 1937. By 1982 the business was the largest private company in Europe, and one time was the largest family owned firm in the UK. In 2002 the retail business was sold by the Moores family to David & Frederick Barclay for £750m. In 2005 the 119 shops were closed, with 40 sold to Primark owner ABF.	
Cyril Livingston				Ladiewear retailer of the 1970s based in Briggate, Leeds.	
The London Corset Company				19th and early 20th century corset maker based at 28 New Bond Street, London.	
Lord John		1963		Founded in Carnarby Street by brothers, Warren, Harold and David Gold. The men's fashion boutique sold clothes that were designed for the "mods" of the era. The business went on to grow to 30 shops before being sold off.	
Peter Lord		1937	c.1990s	Clarks renamed the Abbotts chain of shoe shops based in London, creating the name Peter Lord not to scare their agents. Name continued to be used until the 1990s.	
Lotus Shoes		1903		Founded as shoe manufacturer by parent company Edwin Bostock & Co. Ltd., the business outgrew its parent, and with the merger of Edwin and Frederick Bostock's business' they used the Lotus Ltd name for the company. The retail side of the business started in 1926 with the purchase of 4 retail shops, which wee operated under its subsidiary Lotus and Delta Ltd. In the 1970s the Bostock family ended their affiliation with the company, with Debenhams purchasing the business in 1973. Debenhams' owners, the Burton group sold the business to the Fii group in 1986. The business now operates as a manufacturer and online retailer.	
Luget Brothers		1814	2015	Founded by two Huguenot brothers in Exeter, the bespoke tailoring business finally closed its doors in 2015.	
Lumleys		1900	c.1980s	Founded by boxing promoter Alan Lumley as a sports shop, it was purchased by the Greaves family in 1959. In the 1980s the name was changed to Greaves.	
M & J Sports and Leisure				Small sports shop chain based in South Essex created by former Southend United player, Mike Beesley after buying out H. W. Stone.	
Mackays		1834	2007	Founded by McGeoch family as pawnbrokers in Paisley, Renfrewshire. Converted to clothing in 1953. In 1973 adopted Mackays name. M&Co brand launched in 2003, with all shops being rebranded by 2007.	
Maison Jays				19th-century ladies' costumier and milliner based in Regent Street, London.	
Manfield Shoes		1844	c.1997	Founded in Northampton as a manufacturer and retailer of footwear, the business was purchased by Sears in 1956, and at the time had over 200 shops. In 1996 it sold Manfield Shoes to entrepreneur Stephen Hinchliffe and his business Facia. A year later the business collapsed along with the rest of Hinchliffe's business empire.	
T.Manley				19th-century tailors based in Westminster Bridge Road, London.	
Marcus Shops Ltd				Men's outfitters with 15 shops, purchased by J. M. Millets in 1973.	
Alfred Marsh			1881	19th-century clothier and outfitter with shops in Market Street, Harwich & Key Street, Ipswich. Declared bankrupt in 1881.	
Masters				Manufacturer and retailer of men's clothing, purchased by Great Universal Stores.	
Mates		c.1960s		Founded by Irvine Sellar on Carnaby Street, as what he called the first unisex fashion boutique in Britain. The business expanded to have shops nationwide and had 24 shops by 1969. Irvine Sellars sold the business and went into property development, famously leading the company that developed the Shard.	
Maxwells				Leeds based clothing shop that was located on Vicar Lane.	
Mayron				Chain of ladies' fashion shops owned by department store group J J Allen.	
MC Sports				Chain of sport shops purchased by Blacks, and became part of First Sport.	
McGeoch		1834	1973	Founded by McGeoch family as pawnbrokers in Paisley, Renfrewshire. Converted to clothing in 1953. In 1973 adopted Mackays name. M&Co brand launched in 2003, with all shops being rebranded by 2007.	
McGurk Sports			2013	North East based sports retailer voluntary wound up in 2013.	
Meakers				Chain of men's tailors founded by Benjamin Meaker and Edgar Jesse.	
Medina Shoes				Brand created by Courtesy Shoes to operate their Courtesy Shoes, Skelton and Lees of Leeds shops. The brand name was eventually replaced by Wynsors World of Shoes, also operated by Courtesy Shoes.	
Merc Clothing		1967		Founded by Javid Alavi in London in 1967. The business had a shop at 10 Carnaby Street, but now is an online retailer and manufacturer.	
J.M Millet		1893	1986	Founded by J. M. Millet as a drapers and outfitters business in Southampton and Bristol. The business had 5 shops by 1939, and by 1961 had grown to 11. In the 1970s business Henderson Sports and Marcus Shops Limited were purchased before the business itself was purchased by Foster Brothers in 1979. In 1986 it was merged with A. C. Millett to form Millets Leisure Ltd.	
A.C. Millett & Co		1948	1986	Morris Millett opened a haberdashery shop in Croydon in 1920. By 1948 the business was trading from 8 shops and A. C. Millett joined his father's business after the leaving the army. By 1962 that business had grown to 35 shops, including 13 acquired in that year when ACM bought E. G. Millett & Co., a company owned by a distant cousin of A. C. Millett. In 1978 the business listed on the London Stock Market as Milletts Leisure plc, and in 1984 bought 50 shops from Wakefields (Midlands) Ltd. In 1986 Foster Brothers Clothing acquired Milletts Leisure plc joining Millets and Milletts together to create Millets Leisure Limited.	
E. G. Millett & Co				A group of 13 men's outfitters purchased by A. G. Milletts in 1962.	
Milwards				Reading based footwear group with 20 shops purchased by Clarks and incorporated into the Peter Lord chain.	
Miss Sixty		1990	2008	Founded in Italy in 1990, the first shops opened in the UK in 1998 by its UK subsidiary SixtyUK. The UK business went into administration in 2008.	
Mister Byrite			2002	Founded as A. Levy & Sons in 1912. Traded under various names including Mr Byrite. Blue Inc name introduced in 2002.	
MK One		c.1980s	2008	Founded in the 1980s by Mark Brafman, Les Lucy and Alan Simons as Mark One. In 1996 the business went into administration and was purchased by Philip Green, who in 2003 sold most of the business to Elaine McPherson, the managing director, and David Thompson, the finance director. In 2004 the business was sold to the Icelandic group, Baugur who sold a majority shareholding to Hilco in May 2008, before selling the business back to its founder Mark Brafman. However the business continued to struggle and in November 2008 80 of the shops were sold to Internacionale Retail with the remaining 45 being closed.	
Monument Sports		1974		Founded in 1974 by Middlesbrough F.C. player Bill Gates. The 12 shop chain was purchased by Blacks in 1987 and became part of First Sport.	
Morgan			2008	Morgan de Toi was the UK retail operations of Morgan SA, a French company originally set up to make lingerie in 1947. In 2008 the UK business was put into administration with the closure of its shops and concessions.	
Morrisons				Ladies' clothing chain purchased by Great Universal Stores in 1957.	
David Moseley & Sons			1964	Rubber manufacturer that produced Raincoats and Waterproofs which were sold via their New Bond Street showroom. Was purchased by Avon Rubber Company in 1964.	
Mr Freedom		1969	1972	Founded by Tommy Roberts after purchasing the lease of the boutique Hung on You. The shop moved to Kensington Church Street in 1970 but closed in 1972.	
Naf Naf		1973	c.1990s	Founded as Influence in Paris by Gérard Pariente in 1973, NafNaf (woof woof in French) was launched as a designer brand in 1978. The brand expanded and shops in France opened during the 1980s. During the 1990s they entered the UK market as a distributor and retailer. However, in the late 1990s the retail business in the UK was making losses, so all shops were closed.	
Daniel Neal		1837	1977	Founded as an adult shoe shop in the Edgware Road, London, the business grew into a department store for children's clothes, toys and equipment. In 1963 it was purchased by John Lewis and the business was merged into existing John Lewis shops, except for branches in Bournemouth & Cheltenham, which were closed in 1977.	
H. P. Newman		1909	1919	Founded in 1909 as H. P. Newman, the shop changed its name to Dorothy Perkins in 1919.	
Nicholes Shirt House				Shirt maker that was based at 62 Briggate, Leeds.	
D. Nicholson & Co				Ladies' dressmakers based in St. Pauls Churchard, London.	
H. J. Nicholl & Co		c.19th century	c.1962	Ready made clothing company that made its name during the 1840s and 1850s with manufacturing paletots, a gentleman's overcoat. The business first opened a shop on Regent Street, before opening branches in Manchester, Liverpool, Birmingham, and Paris. The business operated until the 1960s.	
Northern Outsize Menswear		1956	c.1970s	Founded as Northern Outsize Menswear by Bernard Levy as a mail order firm. The business opened its first shop on Edgware Road, London in 1959. During the 1970s the business changed its name to High and Mighty.	
Norvic		1846	1974	Founded by the merger of Howlett and White with the Mansfield Shoe Company. The business was a manufacturer and retailer of footwear, but the 120 strong retail chain was sold to Timpsons in 1971. Timpsons was purchased by UDS in 1972 but the Norvic retail chain was closed down in 1974.	
Nutters of Savile Row		1969	1982	Nutters of Savile Row was opened on Valentine's Day 1969 by Tommy Nutter and Edward Sexton, who had worked together at Donaldson, Williamson & Ward. Nutter left business in 1976, but Edward Sexton continues to run the business changing the name in 1982.	
Oakland Menswear		c.1980s	1997	Created by C&A during the 1980s a standalone business, which was purchased by Stephen Hincliffe's Facia group during the 1990s. Facia however collapsed by 1996, and Ciro Citterio purchased the business from the administrators and rebranded the 27 shops under their branding.	
Officers and Gentleman		c.1990s		Founded in Sunderland, the business changed its name to The Officers Club.	
The Officers Club		c.1990s	2011	Founded in Sunderland as Officers and Gentlemans, the name was changed during the 2000s before the business entered administration in 2008. The business was bought by TimeC 1215, a company backed by the companies chief executive David Charlton. However the business again entered administration in 2011, and 47 shops and the brand name were sold to Blue Inc.	
Old Glory		2005	2011	Clothing wholesaler with shop located in Queens Arcade, Leeds that was dissolved in 2011.	
Olivers		1860	2000	Founded by George Oliver as a shoe shop in Willenhall, Staffordshire in 1860, followed in 1866 with a branch in Neath, Staffordshire. In 1869 he opened a factory, but closed this by 1875 and concentrated on retail. By 1889 he had over 100 shops and advertised himself as the world's largest boot retailer. The business purchased the footwear shops of rival Timpson in 1987, and had 258 shops. In 2000 it was purchased by smaller rival Shoe Zone who re-branded or closed the shops.	
Olympus Sports			1995	Sports clothing and footwear retailer who had 24 shops when purchased by Sears in 1978. In 1995, Mayfind, a private investment company owned by Philip Green and Tom Hunter purchased Olympus Sports from Sears, and merged the shops into Tom Hunter's existing business Sports Division.	
One Up		1993		Clothing & Home discounter created by Shophouse plc. Sold off in 1995 for £20m.	
Open		2014	2015	Men's clothing shop created by former Blue Inc. buying and design director Stephen Galea and was owned by JD Sports. Four months after its first shop out of a total of 11, JD announced that all shops were closing.	
Original Shoe Company		1991		Brand-led fashion footwear shop started in 1991. Purchased by Sports Direct in 2006, but sold to JJB Sports in 2007. Closed as part of JJB trying to save itself from administration.	
Owens				Ladies' outfitters in the 1950s with shops in Preston, Bolton, Eccles, Leigh & Darwen.	
Paige				Ladies' clothing retailer of the 1960s Sold by owners Great Universal Stores in 1986 to Combined English Shops, and at the time had 246 shops. Combined English Shops were purchased by Next in 1987 and Paige shops were gradually closed or converted into the Next format.	
E. Parker				19th-century dressmakers based in Newington Butts, London.	
Parker Franks				North west based discounter of homewares and clothing. Changed its name to Xception.	
Pavilion Clothing		1986	2015	Independent young clothing business based in Wharton Street, Cardiff which closed in 2015 after 29 years of business	
Peter Brown				Menswear chain purchased by Etam in 1987.	
Peter Pell		1957		Founded by Hector Mackenzie Frazer in 1957, three years after selling Town Tailors to Great Universal Stores. In 1964 the menswear manufacturer and 45 shops were sold to UDS.	
Phillips Character Shoes				Shoe retailer owned by British Shoe Corporation.	
Thomas Pike & Co				19th-century tailors based in Westminster Bridge Road, London	
Pilot			2005	70 strong ladies' retail chain that went into administration in 2005.	
Platform Nine				Ladies' fashion retailer of the 1970s and 80s.	
Pocock Brothers		1815	c.1960s	Founded a manufacturer of footwear in 1815, but started around 1870 in retailing their own goods.	
Polikoff				Manufacturer and retailer of men's clothing purchased by Great Universal Stores.	
Pollards		1892	c.1990s	Founded by Waige Pollard, the clothing and haberdashery shop operated across the South East until the mid-1990s.	
Hector Powe		1910		Founded in the City of London, by 1925 the business had expanded to six shops across London. During the Second World War the company provided uniforms for officers in the RAF. The business was purchased by Hope Brothers in 1954, and in turn Great Universal Stores, who merged the business into its Burberry business.	
Preston Sports		1984	c.1995/1996	Former trading name of Sports Direct—formerly Mike Ashley Sports. Changed from Preston to Sports Soccer in 1995/96.	
Marcus Price				1960s chain of menswear shops.	
Priceless Shoes			2013	Merged with Stylo plc during the 1990s, the business became one of its trading arsm, the other being Barratts. However, in 2009 Stylo went into administration. 220 Barratts and Priceless shops were closed, with the remaining 160 shops and 165 concessions being bought by Barratts Priceless Ltd. This however went into administration in 2011, with Barretts Trading, another Michael Ziff vehicle purchasing 89 of Priceless and Barratts shops. This however went into administration in 2013, with 14 shops being sold to Pavers Shoes and the brand and website being sold to footwear entrepreneur Harvey Jacobsen.	
Principles		1984	2009	Founded by Burtons for fashion conscious women, with the men's shop Principle for Men opening in 1985. Menswear shop was phased out in late 90s. Shop sold off by Arcadia group in 2001 to a management buyout vehicle called Rubicon Retail. Rubicon was taken over by Mosaic Fashions in 2005. Mosaic Fashions went into administration in 2009, with all 66 Principles shops closing. The brand continues as part of Debenhams, who bought the name from the administrators.	
Psyche			1989	2022	Founded in 1989 in Middlesbrough, purchased by Fraser Group in 2021.
Pumpkin Patch			2012	Founded in New Zealand in 1990 by Sally Synott as a childrenswear brand. The UK shops were closed in 2012, however the UK website still operates and the clothing could be purchased in some British Home Stores shops.	
QS Shops		1932	2006	QS started life as a clothing manufacturer. In the 1960s they opened their first shop selling clothing rejected by main buyer Marks & Spencer. In the 1980s the shop stopped selling seconds and went private in 1990. Was purchased by Hamsard 2353 in 2003 who brought it together with fellow purchase Bewise. Business went into administration in 2006. Some shops became part of Shop Twenty One.	
Qube				Shoe retailer previously owned by Sir Tom Hunter, then by JJB Sports. Closed as part of JJB trying to save itself from administration.	
Quorum		1964	1969	Boutique based on Kings Road founded by designer Alice Pollock and textile designer Celia Birtwell, which became famous for its Ossie Clark/Alice Pollock fashions. Closed in 1969	
Rabbits & Sons Ltd			1909	Founded in Newington Butts, London as a manufacturer and retailer of footwear, by the 1870s they had multiple shops across London. In 1903 the business was purchased by Freeman, Hardy & Willis and by 1909 had re-branded the shops.	
Ravel Shoes		1934	2007	Founded by Mrs Wise in 1934, the business grew having shops across London. In 1967 they purchased a shop in Oxford Street called Chausseurs Raul, and changed the name at first to Chausseurs Ravel, then just to plain Ravel. In 1974 Clarks bought the remaining shares that they had not bought in 1967 when the Wise family retired. The business grew to 40 shops but in 2007 Clarks decided to rebrand or close Ravel shops due to slowing sales. The Ravel name was purchased by Harvey Jacobson and is one of the 75 brands operated by his business, Jacobson Group.	
Joyce Raymond				Ladieswear retailer based at Jones Corner, Canvey Island.	
Razzle Dazzle				Chain of ladies' fashion clothing shops in the 1980s.	
Red or Dead		1982		Founded by Wayne & Geraldine Hemmingway in 1982 as a stall in Camden Market, they quickly expanded opening their first shop in Rupert Street, Soho in 1986 and gradually growing to 16 shops. In 1995 the Hemmingways sold the business to Stephen Hincliffe's facia group, however this entered administration in 1996 and the Hemmingways purchased the brand back operating it as a design brand only. In 1998 the brand was sold to the Pentland Group.	
Austin Reed		1900	2016	Men's clothing shop whose first London shop was opened in Fenchurch Street in 1900, opening their Regent Street shop in 1911. Entered administration in 2016, with the administrator announcing closure of the brands 120 shops by the end of June 2016, with the brand name being purchased by the Edinburgh Woollen Mills.	
Neville Reed				National chain of men's tailors.	
Rego Clothiers				Manufacturer and retailer of men's clothing purchased by Great Universal Stores. The business had 80 shops across the London district.	
Reid Brothers				Men's tailors that was based at the junction of Briggate, Boar Lane and Duncan Street, Leeds during the 1940s.	
Remelle				High class ladies' outfitters based in Knowsley Road, Bolton during the 1950s.	
Republic		1998		Founded in 1985, as Just Jeans, after 1990, the name changed to Best Jeanswear; Republic was launched in 1998. On 28 February 2013, Sports Direct bought 114 Republic shops, the brand name, all remaining stock and own-brands including SoulCal, Crafted and Fabric from the administrators. The Republic head office was also purchased. Sports Direct attempted to negotiate a reduction in rent for a number of shops, but the proposal was rejected by its landlords for those shops: Intu and Land Securities. As a result, 20 shops were closed. The remaining Republic shops were subsequently merged with USC.	
Richard Shops		1927	1999	Founded by Price Tailors in 1927. Purchased by UDS in 1958. UDS bought by Hanson plc in 1983 and sold Richard Shops to Habitat/Mothercare PLC, which became Shophouse plc (with the merger with BHS). Bought by Sears plc in 1992, which was bought by Sir Philip Green in 1999 and transferred to Arcadia Group. Richard Shops was immediately closed and shops were converted to other Arcadia group brands.	
Ridleys				Men's outfitters based in Tavern Street, Ipswich.	
George Ripley		1952	2016	Menswear shop based in Lytham St. Annes.	
Rogers & Co		1825	1967	Military tailor based in Bruton Street, London which was purchased by Dege & Skinner in 1967.	
Rogers + Rogers		c.1990s	2001	Fashion brand started by Jeffrey Rogers which went into administration in 2001.	
Jeffrey Rogers		c.1990s	2001	Retail business founded by designer Jeffrey Rogers during the 1990s. By 1994 the business had 39 shops. However the business went into administration in 2001. The brand name was purchased by Matalan in 2002.	
Rosees Fashion				Midlands based ladies' fashion chain of the 1960s.	
J. Roussel (Paris-London)				Ladies' undergarment shop with shops at St. Ann Street, Manchester, 84 Bold Street, Liverpool, 179–181 Regent Street & 137 New Bond Street, London with further branches in Aberdeen, Birmingham, Bristol, Glasgow and Leeds.	
T. J. Rowan				19th-century ladies' and gents' tailors based in Kennington Road, London.	
A. W. Rust				Leather retailer founded in Pitsea, Essex and traded for over 60 years in shops across South Essex.	
Samuel Brothers				19th-century tailors based in Piccadilly before moving to Ludgate Hill, London. The business now operates a manufacturer of military and workwear and has been based at Deepcut Barracks since 1993.	
Saxone		1901	1997	Founded in 1901, the shoe retailer and manufacturer merged with rival Lilley and Skinner in 1956. the business was purchased by Sears owned British Shoe Corporation in 1962. In 1996 sold Saxone to entrepreneur Stephen Hinchliffe and his business Facia. A year later the business collapsed along with the rest of Hinchliffe's business empire.	
Scholes & Scholes				Bolton menswear shop based in Nelson House, Nelson Square. The business was voluntary wound up in 1988.	
The Scotch House		1900	2002	A Wollen and Cashmere retailer based in Central London and founded in 1900 by Gardiner Brothers, it was purchased by Great Universal Stores. Business closed in 2002 and merged into Burberry brand, also owned by Great Universal.	
Scotch Wool and Hosiery Shops		1899		Retail name for the wool millers of Fleming, Reid and Co. Acquired by J. and P. Coats, Patons and Baldwins in 1960.	
Scott Adie	LONDON ILLUSTRATED p1.153 ADS. – SCOTT ADIE	1854		Scottish themed clothing warehouse and manufacturer, with shop located on the corner of Regent Street & Vigo Street, London.	
Seftons				Seftons was a small chain of footwear shops based in the Bradford area that was purchased by Courtesy Shoes during the 1960s and rebranded as Medina Shoes.	
Irvine Sellars House of Fashion		c.1960s		Founded by Irvine Sellars, a market trader in London & Essex who opened his menswear boutique on Carnarby Street in the mid 60s before opening his larger boutique chain Mates.	
Seasalt Cornwall			2001	Cornish clothing shop, originally General Clothing Shops, based in Penzance and purchased by the Chadwick family during the 1970s.The Chadwick family changed the business name to Seasalt in 2001.	
Sharps of Preston				Ladieswear shop based in Preston.	
Shellys Shoes		1946		Founded as Direct Shoe Supplies in the Kilburn High Road, the name was changed to Shelly after the owners son Shelly Robbins. The business expanded to 11 shops across the UK including the five floored shop in Oxford Street. In 2002 the struggling business was bought by Stylo, however they disposed of the then 6 shops in 2008 to Eternal Best Industries of Hong Kong. They have since relaunced Shelly of London as shoe brand and website.	
Shoe City		c.1980s	1998	Out of town shoe supermarkets created by the British Shoe Corporation during the 1980s. When Sears broke up the corporation during the 1990s, 47 Shoe City shops was sold to Belgium shoe business Brantano during 1998.	
Shoe Express		1987		New brand created by British Shoe Corporation during the 1980s to improve sales. Shops from other BSC brands were covereted into the new brand – the first being in St. Helens, Lancashire.	
Shoe Studio				Former shoe business owned by Baugur through its subsidiary Mosaic, the business operated 11 stand-alone shops and concessions. The brands operated by Shoe Studio and its concessions were purchased by Dune in 2009.	
Shoefayre		1959	2007	Founded by the Co-operative Group as the co-operative footwear retailer. The business was as a separate business owned by the Co-Op until 2005, when the organisation brought it under the control of its Specialist Retail Division. At the same time the business announced a new refurbishment programme of its 260 shops. In 2007 it was announced that Co-Op were looking for a buyer, and in September it was announced that Shoe Zone had purchased the business. Shoefayre sites were either rebranded or closed by Shoe Zone after the purchase.	
Signet Shoe Company				Shoe retailers based at 184 Oxford Street, London, with further shops in The Strand, Sloane Square, Piccadilly in Manchester and Lord Street, Liverpool.	
Silver Shoes		1980		Founded by Harry Demopoulos as Silver Shoes, becoming Tower Boots before changing its name to TOWER London.	
Simpsons of Picadilly		1894	2000	Founded as S. Simpson by Simeon Simpson was a manufacturer of bespoke tailoring based in London. In 1935 Simeon's son Alexander invented the first supporting trouser, and branded it DAKS. In 1936 Alexander opened the first Simpsons shop – Simpsons of Picadilly to sell he companies clothing. In 1991 the business was sold to Sankyo Seiko Co. Limited, who at the turn of the century moved the shop from Picadilly to Old Bond Street and renamed the business DAKS.	
Smart Weston				National menswear chain.	
Smiths Menswear				Menswear chain headquartered in Edinburgh.	
Snob		c.1960s	c.1980s	1960s boutique fashion brand that started the change in clothing purchases. Bought by Etam in 1987 and were eventually rebranded under the Etam or Tammy Girl names.	
C. G. Southcott & Co		c.1880s	1980	A partnership founded in the 1880s as a clothing manufacturer, the business opened its first retail shop in the early 1900s. Mainly a retailer of menswear, the business also moved into manufacturing school uniforms. The business finally closed in 1980.	
John Southworth				A shoe shop based in Preston purchased by Clarks in 1935.	
Spalding & Sons		19th Century	1940s	Chelmsford based sports outfitters, which were also a photography shop and toy seller. Originally based on Tindall Square before moving to property next to Saracen Head at 4–5 High Street in 1892.	
Sports Connection		1980	2003	Scottish based Sports chain that operated 30 shops until it went into administration in 2003. 24 of the shops were purchased by the Original Shoe Company.	
Sports Division		1984	1998	Started by Tom Hunter from the back of a van. He built the business up to the UK's largest sorts retailer, purchasing Sears Olympus Sports, before selling the business to smaller rival JJB in 1998.	
Sports Soccer		c.1995–96	2005	Preston Sports changed their name to Sports Soccer in 1995 along with their head office relocation to Dunstable. Name was changed to Sports World in 2005.	
Sports World		2005	2007	Rebranded name for Sports Soccer, which was re-branded to Sports Direct from 2007.	
Start-rite Shoes		1920		Started by a Quant & Son, a shoe retailer in 1920, the business was purchased by James Southall, a footwear manufacturer in 1921. The business grew into a manufacturing name and retail business, before the retail business was closed down and shops sold to Jones the Bootmaker.	
Stead & Simpson			2008	Founded in Leeds during the 19th century as curriers and leather dealers, the business moved into the manufacturing and retailing of footwear. During the 1990s, they purchased the chains Lilley & Skinner and Shoe Express from Sears, however the business went into administration in 2008, and was purchased by Shoe Zone who converted most of the shops to the Shoe Zone brand.	
Mabel Stephenson Ltd				Ladies' clothing shop based in Blackburn that was purchased by the Lytham St. Annes department store J.R. Taylor.	
Stewarts				Middlesbrough based menswear manufacturer and retailer with 130 shops purchased by Prices Tailors, owners of Fifty Shilling Tailor, in 1932.	
Stirling Cooper		1967	c.1990s	Stirling Cooper was started by two London cab drivers Ronnie Stirling and Jeff Cooper in 1967 as a London-based fashion wholesaler and retailer. The business operated until the 1990s.	
Stone Dri - The Direct Raincoat Company		1948	c.1970s	Founded when the four Stone brothers took over their father's coat making business. The business expanded into retail and by 1960 had over 80 shops nationwide. The business closed during the 1970s.	
H. W. Stones Sports				Essex based sports shop chain created by local multiple electrical retailer and Fiat/Alfa Romeo dealer who helped set up Essex Radio. Dennis Lloyd, father of British tennis stars John and David Lloyd, ran the Leigh shop. The business was sold off to Mike Beesley to form M & J Sports.	
Streetwise Sports			2009	Founded by Paul & Ian Simpson, the 32 shop chain was purchased by Sports Direct in 2006. The business was sold by Sports Direct to Melvyn Reiss and Stephen Mucklow in 2008, however the business entered administration in Feb 2009.	
Jeanne Stuart of Blackpool				Ladies' fashion shop located at 13 & 23 Queen Street, Blackpool.	
Studd & Millington				Tailors of the early 20th century based in several locations across London. Also supplied officers of the British Army with uniform.	
Stylo		1935		Founded as Stylo Boot Company (Northern) Ltd after the amalgamation of three shoe business. In 1964 it had 150 shops and purchased rival W Barratt Boot & Shoe Company. Eventually all branches were rebranded under the Barrets name.	
SU214		c. Late 1990s		High-fashion menswear chain created by Arcadia group and named after the address of its flagship shop – 214 Oxford Street. Business was incorporated into Topman under the 'BrandMAX' initiative.	
Sugg Sports			2001	Founded in Liverpool by Walter Sugg and his brother Frank, the business grew to 11 shops by its closure in 2001.	
The Suit Company		1982	2000	Retail brand opened by Moss Bros, which was incorporated into the new Code brand that existed from 2000 to 2002.	
Suits You			2010	Rebranded name of Brick's Manshops, by Brian and Alex Brick, who sold their retail business SRG in 2005 for £30m. The business was purchased by Egyptian group Arafa Holdings in 2008. However the 66-shop business entered administration in October 2010, 12 of the shops were purchased by the former owners and re-opened as Suit Direct.	
Sullivan Sports				Liverpool based chain of sport shops purchased by Blacks Leisure in 1987.	
Swears and Wells		1816	c.1970s	Started by Frederick Swears and Thomas William Wells in Regent Street, the shop became a national chain of furriers that was purchased by UDS and closed during the 1970s.	
Take 6		c.1960s		Boutique founded in Carnaby Street, London that grew into a chain of fashion shops.	
Tammy Girl			2005	Founded by Etam UK as its children's business, the business was purchased by Philip Green in 2005, with all shops closed and the (now called) Tammy brand incorporated into British Home Stores.	
E. Tautz & Sons		1867		Men's tailors which opened a shop at 485 Oxford Street. Shop destroyed by fire in 1898. Now a brand owned by tailors Norton & Sons.	
Gilbert Taylor				Men's outfitters based in Garden Street, St Annes on Sea and Deansgate, Bolton.	
Teesside Sports				Sports shop chain bought by Blacks in 1987, which became part of First Sport.	
John Temple Tailors				Men's tailors chain purchased by Great Universal Stores.	
Thomas & Sons				Ladies' and gents' hunting tailors based in Brook Street, London.	
Thornton & Co				A manufacturer of Indian Rubber goods and seller of athletic wear who were based at 50/51 Briggate, Leeds. The building is now Grade II listed.	
Tie Rack		1981	2013	Tie Rack was founded in August 1981 by Roy Bishko with the first shop opening in Oxford Street, London. The business expanded to over 300 shops across the world, however in 2013 it was announced that all 44 of the remaining UK shops would be closed.	
Timpson		1865	1987	Founded in Manchester by William Timpson and his brother in law, Walter Joyce as a shoe retailer. In 1884 they moved into manufacturing and then repairs in 1903. In 1973 after a boardroom battle between the Timpson family, United Drapery Shops purchased the business. UDS was purchased by Hanson Trust in 1983, and the breakup of the company included the sale of Timpson back to a buyout led by John Timpson. In 1987, Timpson sold off the shoe retailing business to rival Olivers, retaining the shoe repair business.	
Tissimans		1601	2013	Opened as Slaters in 1601, before being renamed as Tissimans in the early 19th century. Closed by owners W. E. Cole in 2013. Before its closure it claimed to be the world's oldest men's clothing establishment.	
Top Footwear for Men		1962	1992	It was founded in St. Albans in 1962. By 1973 the business had expanded to six shops, and this had grown to 23 by the end of the 1980s. In 1987 it changed its name to Top Shoes for Men. In 1991 the shop became Top Shoes, selling both men's and ladies' ranges, and in 1992 started changing the brand to SOLETRADER. By 2000 there were 40 shops in the chain. In 2003 the business started sister brand Sole, selling more luxury brands.	
Tower Boots		1980		Founded by Harry Demopoulos as Silver Shoes, becoming Tower Boots before changing its name to TOWER London.	
Town Tailors		c.1930s		Founded by Hector MacKenzie Frazer, it was a Manufacturer and retailer of men's clothing purchased by Great Universal Stores in 1954.	
Trewby Brothers				19th-century ladies' costumier based in Waterloo Road, London.	
True Form		c.1891	1997	Founded by John (known as Jack) Sears in Northampton as a low price manufacturer and retailer of shoes. Charles Clore purchased J Sears & Co, the parent company in 1953, and in 1956 reorganised Sears shoe business' into the British Shoe Corporation. In 1996 it sold True Form to entrepreneur Stephen Hinchliffe and his business Facia. A year later the business collapsed along with the rest of Hinchliffe's business empire.	
S Tully				19th and early 20th century dressmaker and milliner based at 21 Great Russell Street, London.	
Turnbull, Reakes & Co				19th-century tailors based in The Strand, London.	
Turner Shoes				150 strong chain of shoe shops purchased by Hepworths in 1978.	
Tyler Shoes		1817	1996	Founded in Leicester in 1817 as a boot manufacturer, they branched out into retailing having shops across the UK and Eire. In 1986 the business was purchased by Bensonshoe and its 61 shops were incorporated under the Discount Shoe Zone brand from 1996.	
Van Allen			1981	Ladies' fashion shop which closed in 1981 after being purchased by UDS three years earlier.	
Vantella				Men's shirts shop that was based at 465 Oxford Street, London.	
Vince Man's Shop		1954	1969	Founded by Bill Green initially as a mail order business, before opening a boutique in Newburgh Street, London. The business continued to operate until it was closed in 1969.	
Virgo			2015	London based ladies' fashion retailer that went into administration in January 2015.	
Vogue Fashion Shops				Clothing retaler owned by Great Universal Stores.	
Wade Smith		1981	2005	Founded by Robert Wade Smith in Liverpool, the footwear retailer expanded to a 10 shop fashionwear chain before being purchased by the Arcadia Group in 1998. The business was sold by Arcadia back to Robert Wade Smith in 2001. The business closed down in 2005.	
Wakefields (Midlands) Ltd				Chain of 50 shops purchased by A G Milletts in 1984	
F. Wallis				Hosier and glover based at 56 Briggate, Leeds. In 1919 the shop was replaced by Timpsons.	
Walwyns				A shoe shop based in Moseley, Birmingham purchased by Clarks.	
Terry Warner Sports			2000	Group of 21 shops, which was part of a management buyout in 1997. The shops were purchased by Hargreaves Sports in 2000.	
Watson Prickard		c.19th century	2010	Founded in Liverpool during the 19th century, A W Cockeram bought the men's outfitters in 1893. The Liverpool shop was located at North John Street in Liverpool, and by the 1950s had a shop at 73/75 Princess Street, Manchester. In 1993 the business opened a shop in Lord Street, Southport, however this was closed by Howard Cockeram in 2010.	
Fred Watts & Co				19th-century menswear shop based in Tottenham Court Road & Euston Road, London, which was believed to have been swallowed up by rival London firm Chas Baker & Co.	
Weaver to Weaver		c.1930s		Retail arm of Towns Tailors. Name was changed to Towns Tailors after Great Universal Stores purchased the business in 1954.	
Werff				Werff Brothers were founded in London during the 19th century and by the 1960s were a national chain for ladieswear. Werff also operated the My Fur Lady fur brand.	
West 8				Small chain of sports shops based in London owned founded by the Spurling family. The business was bought by Blacks Leisure in 1988 and merged into its newly created First Sport division.	
Western Jean Company		1976		Chain of jeans and casual wear shops purchased by French Connection. Company is still registered as a dormant business along with French Connection at 20–22 Bedford Row, London.	
Whitneys				Clothing retaler owned by Great Universal Stores.	
Wilderness Ways			1997	Outdoor clothing, footwear and equipment chain purchased and rebranded by Nevisport in 1997.	
Willerby & Co				Men's tailors	
Williams & Hopkins			c.1970s	Costumier and draper based in Bournemouth, whose name appeared in Vogue during the 1950s.	
J. O. Williams		1895		Based in the Castle Buildings, Llanelli. The self-styled ladies' and gents' tailor and costumier was an agent for Burberry.	
Willsons Fashions				Ladies' fashion retailer that expanded after the Second World War.	
Wiltex				Retail chain based in north of England purchased by Parkash Singh Chima along with Wiltex to form Bonmarché.	
J & C Winter				Holborn, London based Tailors and Outfitters founded in the 19th century.	
Woodrow				Millners and outwear retailer based at 48Piccadilly, London with further branches at 42 Cornhill, London as well as Manchester, Liverpool, Glasgow and Dublin.	
Woolf Brothers				19th-century men's tailors based in King William Street, London.	
M. Woolf				19th-century tailors based in Lower Marsh, Lambeth, London.	
Worth Et Cie				19th century corset makes based at 134 New Bond Street.	
Woven Trends		2017		Ladies' clothing and accessories company based in West Reading, specializing in luxury ladies' wear and accessories.	
Wyles Brothers				Founded in Derby as a footwear manufacturer, they moved into retail and had 50 shops before they were bought by G B Britton & Sons, manufacturers of TUF shoes in 1961.	
Xception				New name for North West-based Parker Franks, a discounter selling a variety of clothes and homewares	
YHA Adventure Shops		1950	2004	Founded by the YHA as mail order business, the first shop opened in 1953 in Bedford Street, London. In 1990 the shop management bought the business from the YHA and formed YHA Adventure Shops plc. This company was wound up in 2004.	
Zara				Ladies' accessory shop located at 71 New Bond Street, London at the turn of the century.	
