= Tissimans =

English clothing company

- Industry: Clothing
- Founded: 1601
- Defunct: 28 February 2013
- Headquarters: Bishop's Stortford, United Kingdom

Tissimans was a clothing company located in Bishop's Stortford, Hertfordshire, England founded in 1601 it ceased trading on 28 February 2013.
