= Pretty Eccentric =

British clothing retailer

- Industry: women's fashion brand
- Founded: 2009
- Founder: Michelle Scott

Pretty Eccentric™ is a British fashion label

The first store opened in Brighton's Lanes district in October 2009

== Corporate History ==
Pretty Eccentric was founded in 2009 by designer Michelle Scott. Previously, she had a career at the Arcadia Group, Whistles, House of Fraser and The Body Shop, but she had always harboured a lifelong ambition to create her own clothing brand.

== Product ==
"This dress emporium certainly majors on pretty creations. Come here for exquisite bias-cut 1930s and 1940s tea dresses, floaty gauzy flappers’ frocks, vintage-style feather boas and velvet boleros: everything you need for a day at Goodwood Revival, an evening at Glyndebourne or simply a stylish dinner out." The Telegraph, UK, 18th March 2026.

Pretty Eccentric designs distinctive clothing, handbags, accessories and fine fragrance. Beaded dresses with bows, frills, lace and old-fashioned glamour that is the design handwriting. "Pretty Eccentric brings a shot of old-fashioned glamour.", Vogue, UK, 1 May 2011.
