= Soletrader =

British shoe retailer

SoleTrader
- Type: Shoes
- Founded: 1962
- Number of locations: UK
- Parent: Twinmar Group Ltd
- Website: Official website

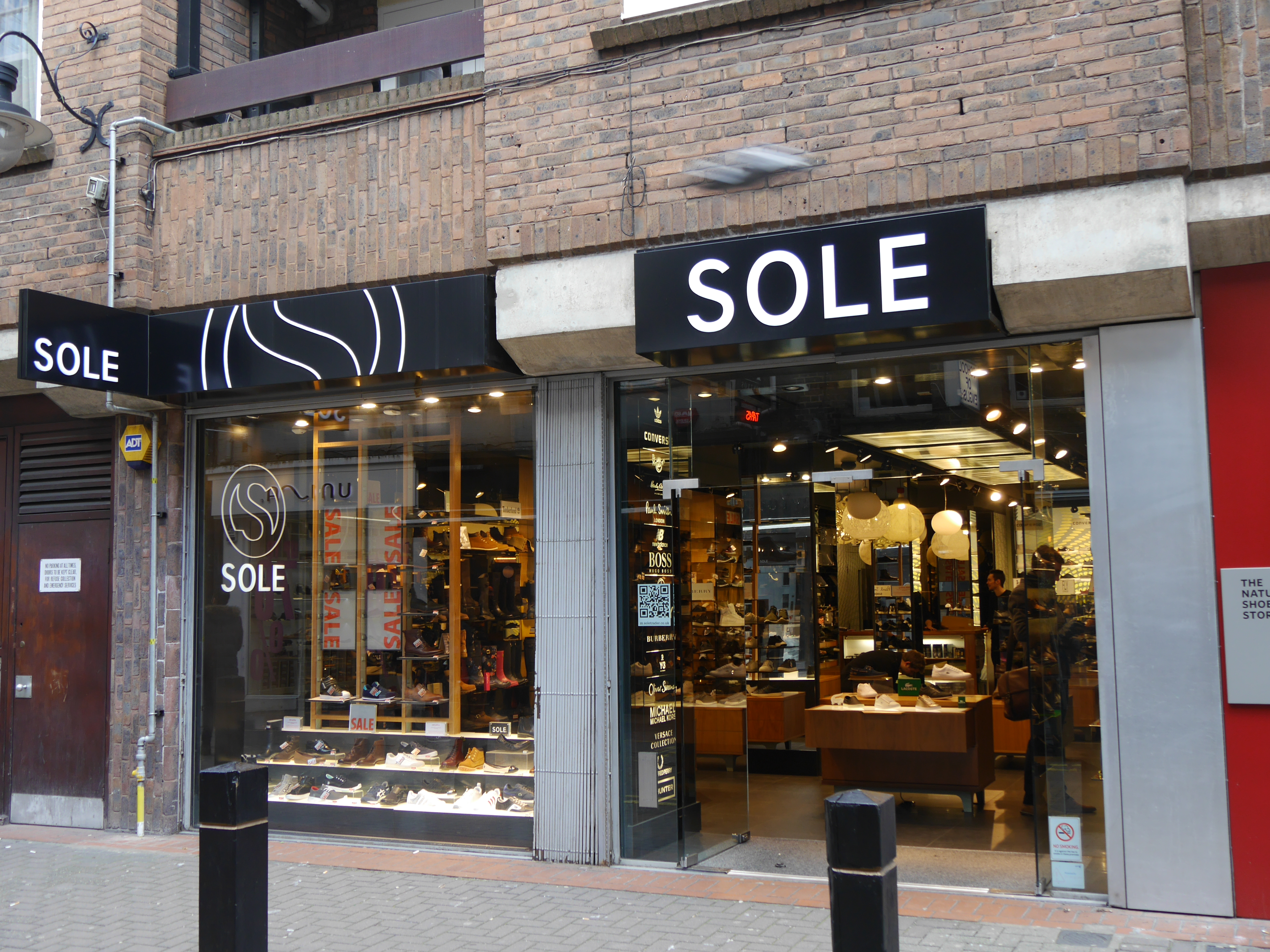
Sole, Neal Street, Covent Garden

Soletrader is a British shoe retailer that operates with 28 UK standalone stores and 4 department store concessions, and through its international websites. Of their 28 standalone stores in the UK 18 trade in shopping centres and on high streets as Sole and Soletrader and 10 trade in outlet centres, 5 of which are operated by the McArthur Glen Group.

Soletrader began trading in the 1940s under the original company name of Boro and Redmond Ltd and was involved in wholesaling and importing footwear from Spain and Eastern Europe for supply to retailers. Boro and Redmond Ltd (then based on Kings Road, London) gave the first order for Dr. Martens Airwair boots to R Griggs and Son. Dr. Martens Airwair boots became an iconic cultural icon and their popularity was the catalyst for the founding of the retail chain that trades as SOLETRADER. In May 2020 Soletrader offered the products of 140 brands on its UK website.

Peter Mercer opened the first store in St Albans in 1962. In 2011, Soletrader had 52 stores in the UK.

Due to the COVID-19 pandemic, in June 2020, Twinmar Ltd, the company that operated the brick and mortar stores went into voluntary liquidation, permanently closing 8 of the 37 stores it had at the time. The remaining stores reopened from July 2020, operated by Twinmar London Ltd.

In April 2021 Soletrader opened 4 performance athletic footwear concessions in Fenwick department stores, operating under the name Sneakers x Soletrader.

The international online Soletrader business is operated by Twinmar Tech Ltd, that also provides 3rd party tech and logistics services.
