= Emmett London =

Jermyn Street shirt-makers founded by tailor Robert Emmett in 1992

- Industry: Shirtmakers
- Founded: 1992
- Headquarters: 380 King's Road, London
- Key people: Robert Emmett
- Website: Emmett London

Emmett London is a Jermyn Street shirt-makers founded by tailor Robert Emmett in 1992. Emmett London's first store opened on the Kings Road in 1992, since then it has opened stores on Eldon Street in the City, Jermyn Street in the West End and Canary Wharf. The company also operates an ecommerce website.

== Product offering ==
Emmett is primarily known for its formal and casual shirts. The vast majority of shirts are seasonal designs made in very small quantities (typically 25 shirts are made in each design) from premium fabrics, typically woven in Italy. All of Emmett's off-the-peg shirts have a contrasting fabric on the undercuff.

Alongside shirts, Emmett also sells a selection of accessories, including ties, scarves, socks, boxer shorts, cufflinks, pocket squares and swimwear.

In 2006 Emmett launched a made-to-measure service for shirts and suiting.
