= Freeman, Hardy and Willis =

Chain of footwear retailers in the United Kingdom

- Industry: Online Retailer
- Founded: 1875–1996 (Stores); 2020– (Online)
- Headquarters: Gloucester, UK, United Kingdom
- Number of locations: Online only
- Key people: Alfred Freeman
- Products: Footwear
- Owner: Gardiner Bros & Co. Ltd.
- Website: https://fhwbrands.com/

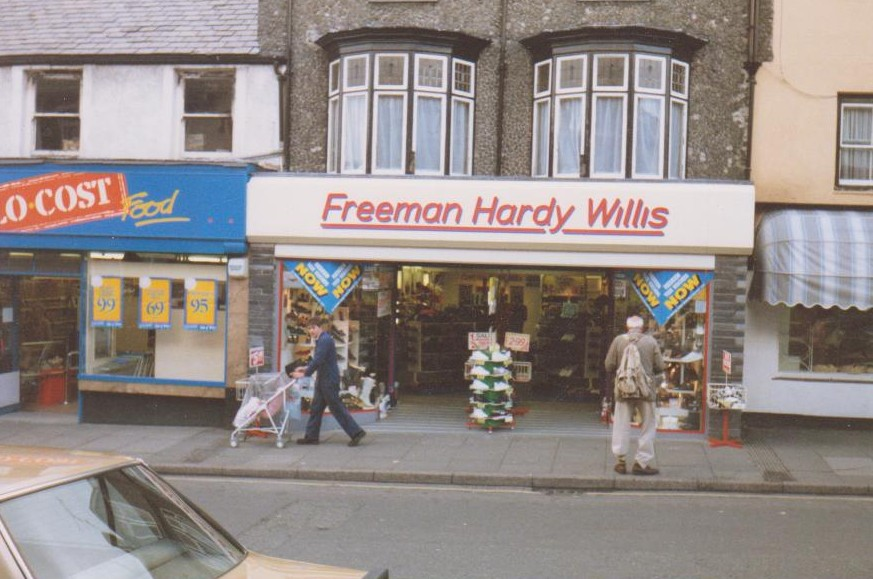
Freeman Hardy Willis branch in Porthmadog, North Wales, in 1987. This subsequently became Stead & Simpson in 1996 and then Shoezone, which closed in May 2023

Freeman, Hardy and Willis is a major chain of footwear retailers in the United Kingdom between 1875 and 1996. Since 2020, it operates exclusively online.

== History ==
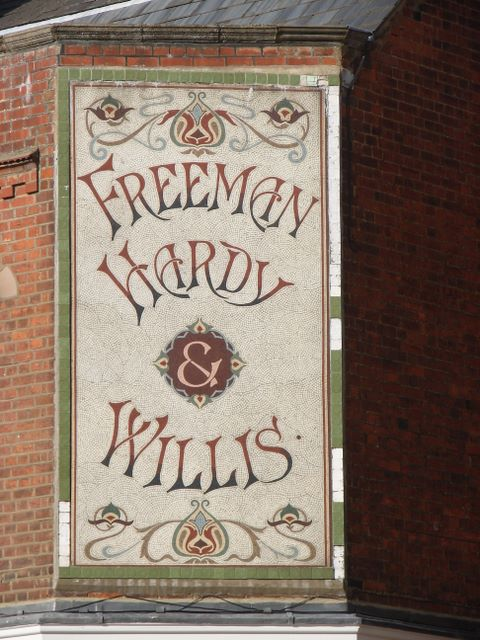
An old sign in Hitchin Market Square

The shoe retailer was established in 1875 and was named after three employees of the company, one of whom was Alfred Freeman, a Russian shoe maker who lived in St Pancras, London. For many years, there was a branch in nearly every town in the United Kingdom. In 1929 the company was acquired by Sears plc. Its subsidiary, the Leicester-based British Shoe Corporation, went on to own the Trueform, Curtess, Dolcis, Manfield, Saxone, and Lilley & Skinner brands. The name was also simplified to Freeman Hardy Willis in order to have bolder lettering on shopfronts. During the early 1960s the paper bags used to wrap the shoes were imprinted with the FHW letters and the legend "For Happy Walking".

== Sale of company ==
In the early 1990s the British Shoe Corporation converted approximately half of the 540 Freeman Hardy Willis branches into Hush Puppies shops and sold the remainder to Stephen Hinchliffe, an entrepreneur from Sheffield. After only a year, Hinchliffe's business empire collapsed. He was subsequently jailed after it was found that he bribed bank officials to obtain loans to buy the company. After providing "Shoes For All The Family" since 1875, Freeman Hardy Willis was no more by 1996. After closure, 44 former FHW branches were sold to Stead & Simpson.

British Shoe Corporation itself closed in 1998.

In more recent years, the Freeman Hardy & Willis name has reappeared online, now owned by Gardiner Bros & Co (Leathers) Ltd.
