= FHW =

FHW may refer to:

- Freeman, Hardy and Willis, a British footwear retailer
- Foreign Armies West (German: Fremde Heere West), a Nazi German military intelligence organization; see German code breaking in World War II
- Hanau West station, in Hanau, Germany
