= Stylo =

Stylo may refer to:

- Stylosanthes, A widely cultivated plant genus native to the Americas
- Barratts Shoes A UK brand of footwear
- "Stylo" (song), a single from British virtual band Gorillaz
- Stylographic pen, a type of fountain pen
