= Foyleside Shopping Centre =

Coordinates: 54.994°N 7.318°W

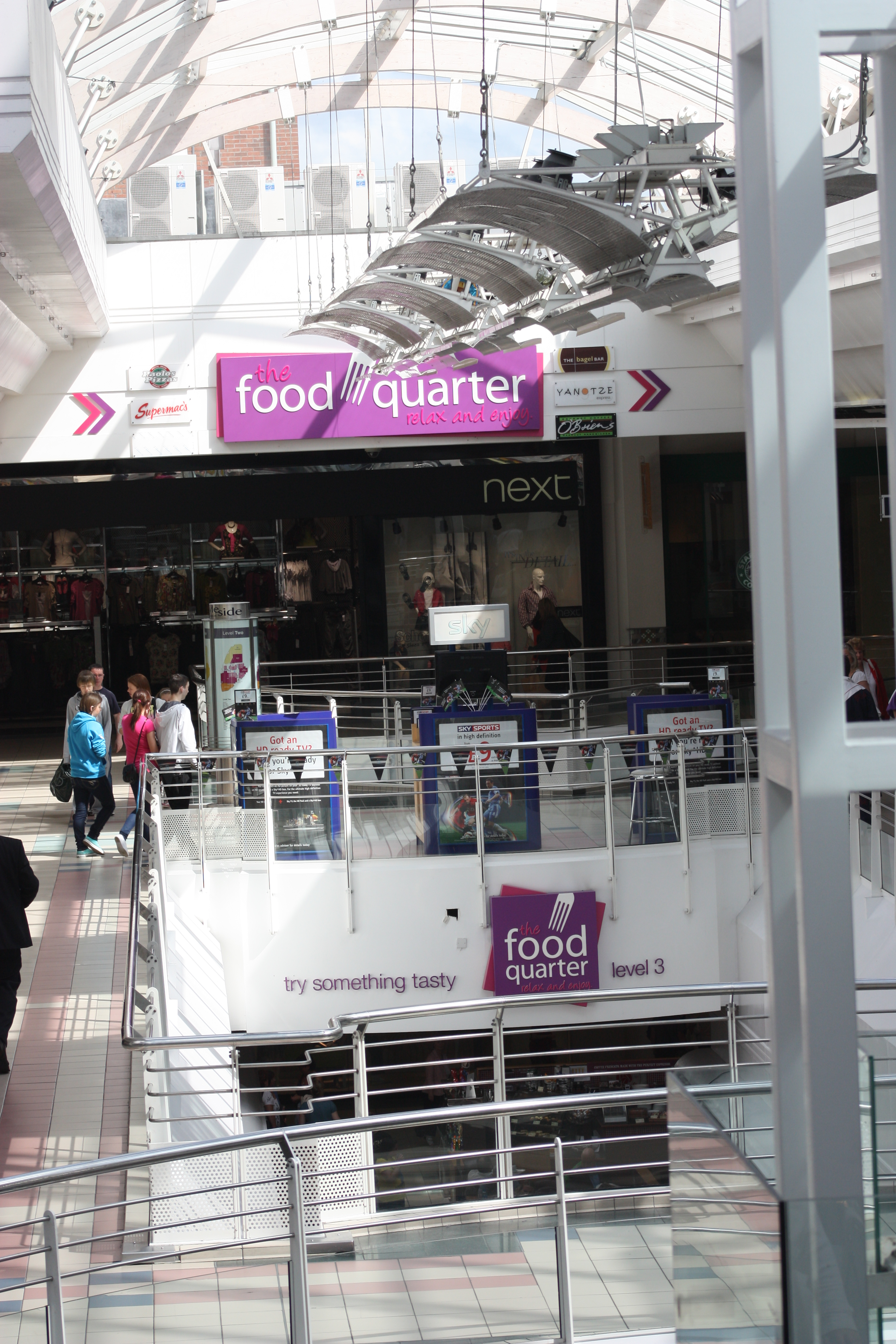
- Foyleside in August 2009
- Location: Derry, Northern Ireland
- Address: 19 Orchard St, Derry BT48 6XY
- Opened: September 25, 1995; 31 years ago
- Developer: O'Connell Brothers
- Manager: Savills
- Owner: Foyleside Acquisitions Limited
- Num. of stores: 50
- Num. of anchor tenants: 3
- Floor area: 37,160 m^{2}
- Floors: 4
- Parking: 1,520
- Public transit: Derry ~ Londonderry railway station, Ulsterbus
- Website: www.foyleside.co.uk

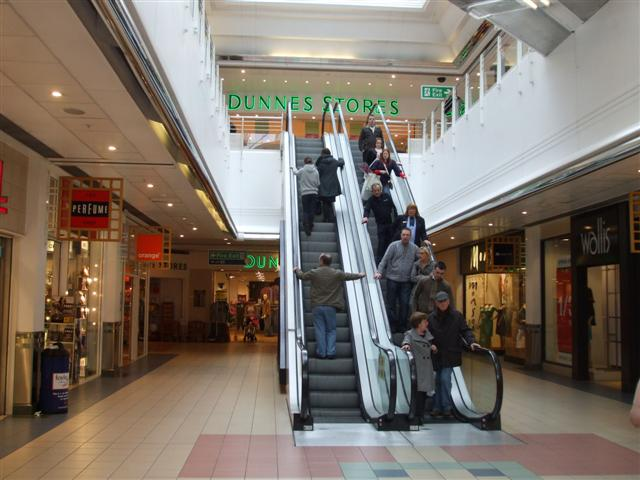
Level 2 (2009)

Foyleside Shopping Centre is a shopping centre in Derry, Northern Ireland. Construction started in the early 1990s and the centre opened on 25 September 1995. As of April 2023 the centre is 98% let across 55 units. The centre is spread over a 6.99-acre site in the city centre of Derry. Foyleside extends to a size of 37,160 square meters, (400,000 square feet), making it the second largest shopping centre in Northern Ireland behind Belfast's Victoria Square. The centre is anchored by Marks & Spencer, Frasers and Dunnes Stores.

The shopping centre is built into the centre of the city and although it is not on the bank, it does overlook the River Foyle.

== History ==
The project to build a shopping centre in the North West of Northern Ireland which would become Foyleside was envisioned in 1988 as part of a powerful regeneration campaign for the City of Derry. It was the result of campaigning by local politicians to attract the attention and investment of private firms. According to a local newspaper article in 1995 Northern Ireland Minister Richard Needham had convinced Marks & Spencer to co-anchor the centre project alongside Dunnes Stores. MP John Hume in the same article also voices praise on the economic benefits such as the employment that the new centre would bring and its effort in improving the image of the city and the North Wests image of a regional shopping destination. Foyleside opened on 25 September 1995 at 11am. Stores included anchor tenants Marks & Spencer and Dunnes Stores, normal tenants also included Iceland, Dixons, Cafe Kylemore, McDonald's and Adams.

In 2003, planning permission was granted for a significant two floor extension on top of the existing Foyleside East Car Park, with construction work completed by late 2004.

In 2004, a significant extension to the centre was added to accommodate a new Debenhams department store which would be the third anchor tenant for Foyleside. The four-story building was owned and operated by Debenhams from 2004 until 2021, before being purchased by Frasers Group. In 2007 Marks & Spencer downsized their outlet, reducing it from two floors to one, on Level 2. Next replaced Marks & Spencer on Level 3.

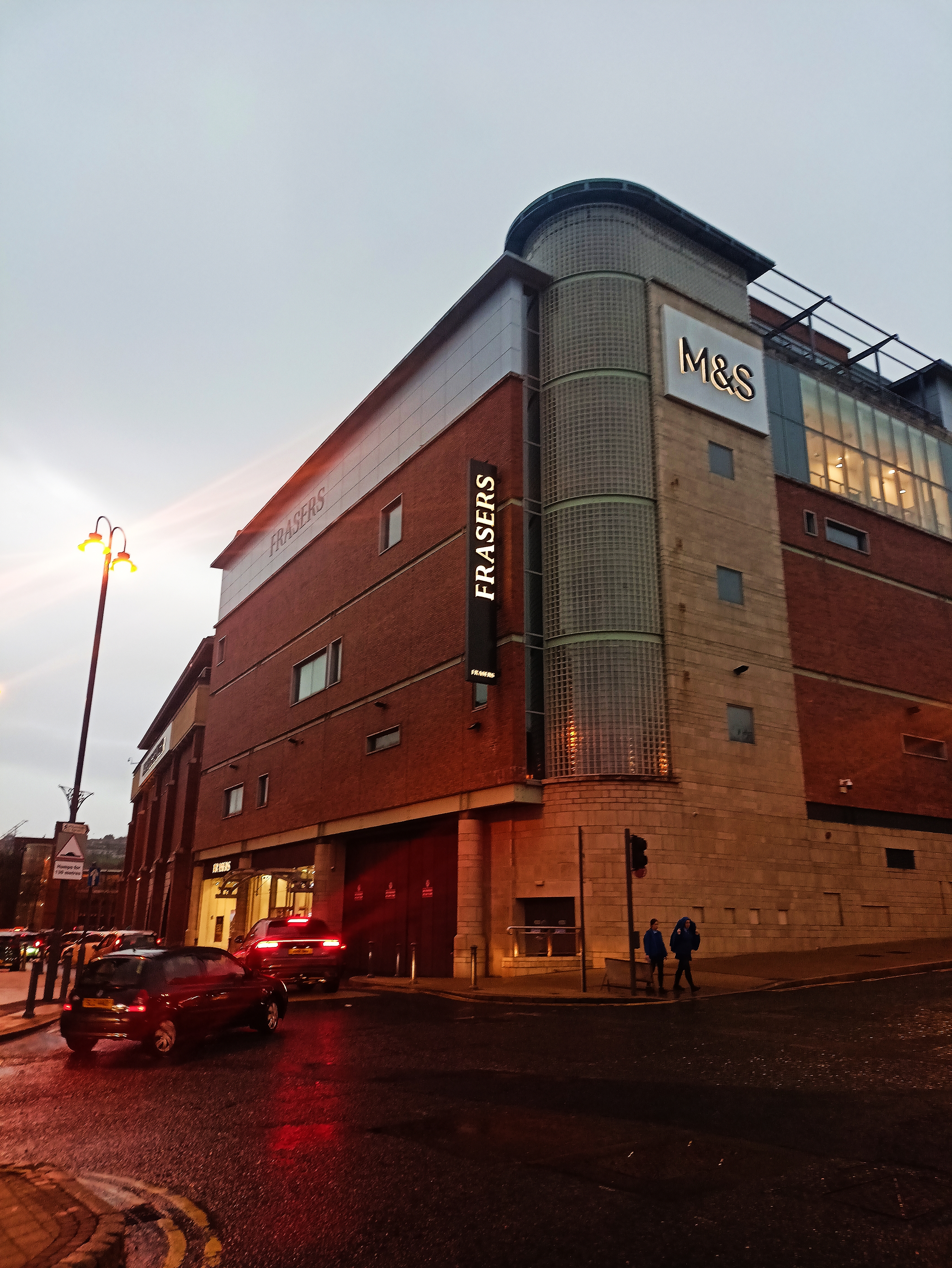
Frasers Anchor Building (as of 2024)

In 2008, the Food Quarter moved from the fourth floor into a newly built area on the third floor. The area featured 6 new eateries and a new toilet facility, it features a local radio station broadcast studio which is used part time, there is also a kids play area at the farthest end and the recent addition of a sensory room. The former Food Quarter on the fourth floor became a normal retail area.

In 2014, it was announced that developers had approached Derry City Council with the intention of developing a new Foyleside block which would include an extra 235,000 square footage of retail space, as well as a nine screen cinema and 67,000-square-foot (6,200 m^{2}) of office space. This has the potential to create 500 construction jobs and 300 permanent jobs if allowed to proceed. This development would cost in the region of £100 million. Further to this Minister for Regional Development, Conor Murphy has hinted that he would welcome any plans for the relocation of the current railway station to the east bank of the Peace Bridge, which officially opened on Saturday 25 June 2011. Following Foyleside's sale in 2023, the plan of bringing a cinema and offices was discussed again.

In 2021, following the closure of Debenhams, the store was put up for sale and most of it (except the cafe) was purchased by Frasers Group. After renovation in 2021, a new Frasers department store opened on the ground level and first floor. A Sports Direct store opened on levels two and three, relocating from the Richmond Centre nearby, a nearby GAME retail store also relocated from the Richmond Centre to the level 3 of the relocated Sports Direct store and includes a Belong gaming arena.

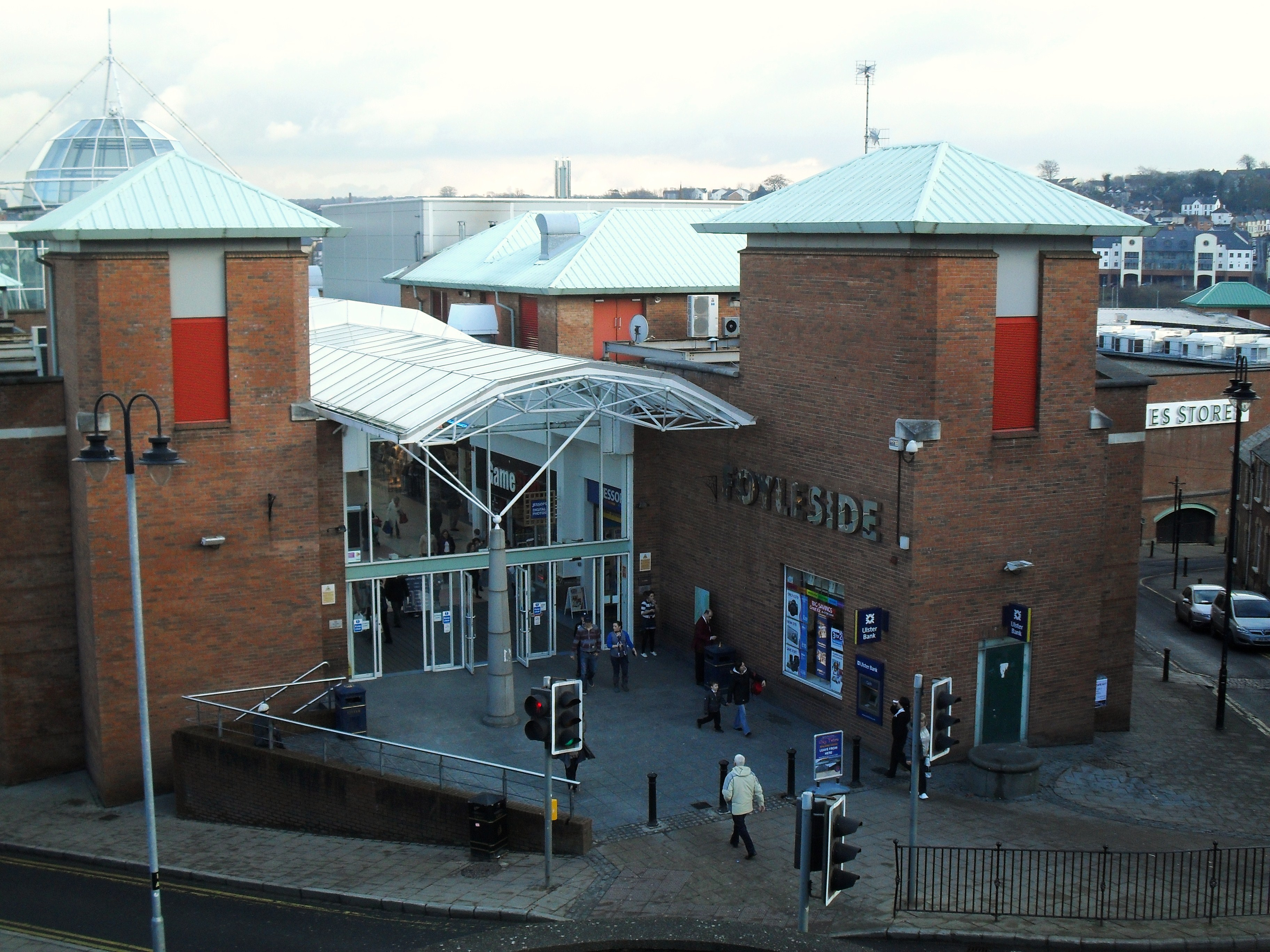
Ferryquay Street entrance

On September 15, 2023, it was announced that a consortium which includes Ian McMahon along with Patrick and Edmund Simpson, were understood to have agreed terms to buy Foyleside Acquisitions Limited, the holding company for the Derry shopping complex, the same consortium also owns Rushmere Shopping Centre under holding company Killahoey Limited. They are believed to have agreed a deal that will see Foyleside sold for below its £34.25 million guide price.

In 2024, Foyleside announced that that it would go through a major investment, the development began with the renovation of a Costa Coffee store in the centre and the relocation of Pavers to make way for a new Caffe Nero, alongside the opening of a new Mango outlet. In January 2025, Foyleside announced that new tiles, skirting boards and refreshed toilet facilities would be added, alongside new entrances and toilet facilities on Levels 1 and 4.

Later in 2025, Foyleside announced the closure of its Food Quarter, with its three remaining tenants forced to close, including Supermac's only location in Northern Ireland. In 2026, Foyleside announced that the former Food Quarter would be repurposed as part of an expansion and modernisation of anchor tenant Dunnes Stores to create their largest flagship store in Northern Ireland.

== Design and construction ==
The centre is a four level building constructed over numerous former streets made possible by the steep geography of the banks of the River Foyle which is characteristic of Derry. The centre is over 34,400 square metres (370,000 square feet) in size. A glass dome above the central atrium of the mall serves as a focal point. A custom built Kone glass elevator is the centrepiece and originally overlooked a water fountain which was removed in 2016.

=== Contractors ===
The main contractors for Foyleside were Brampton O'Hare Ltd. Classic Ceilings were contracted for the suspended ceilings and drywall partitions. J. Young & Son were the primary electrical engineer contractors on the project.

== Mall Levels ==
Unlike most shopping centres in the United Kingdom and Ireland, Foyleside refrains from using the term 'Ground Floor', this is as a result of the steep topography of Derry, meaning Levels 1,2 and 4 all have 'Ground floor entrances', so the centre avoids using the terminology as to not confuse customers.

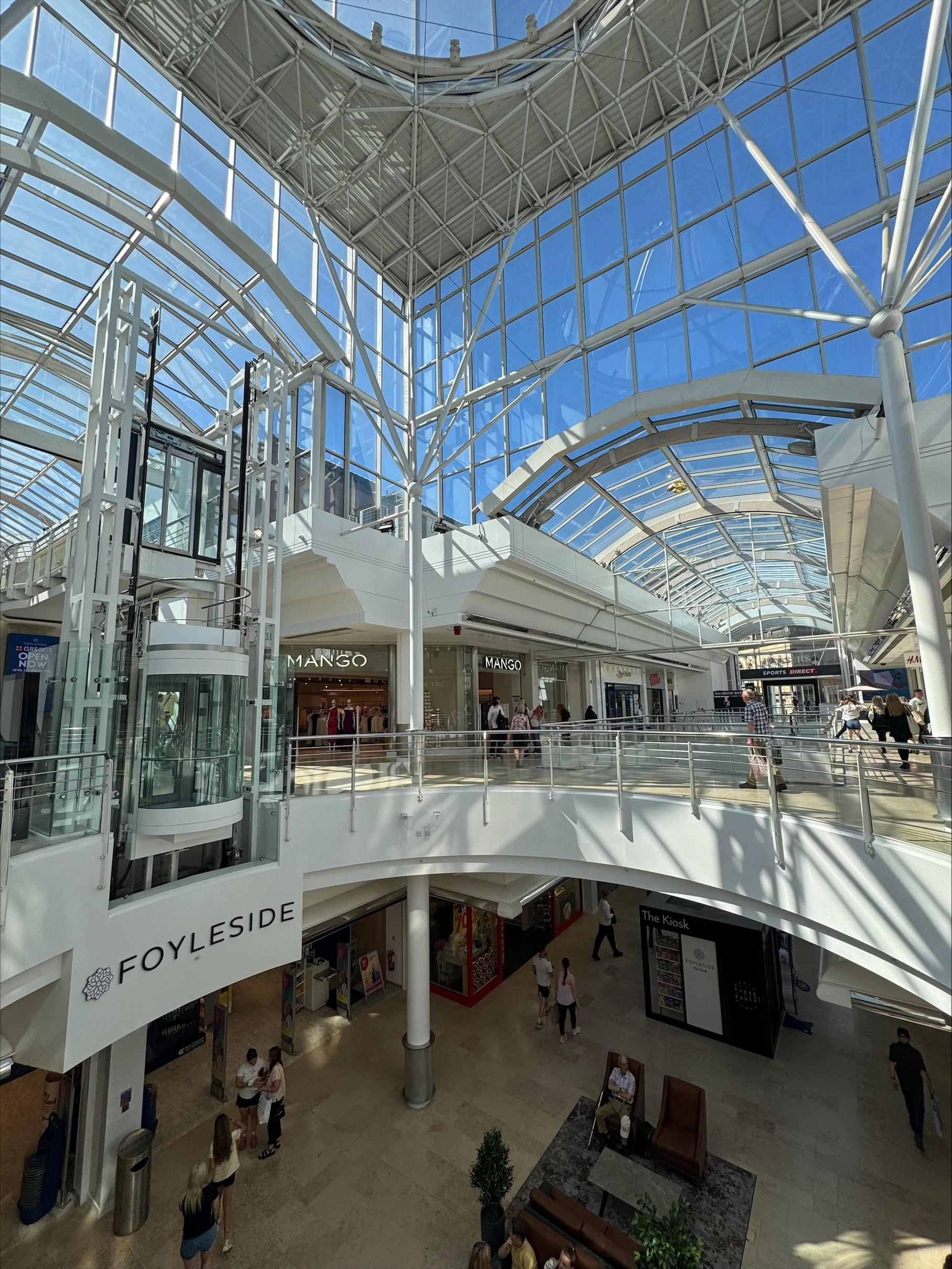
Foyleside's Main Atrium (2026)

=== Level 1 ===
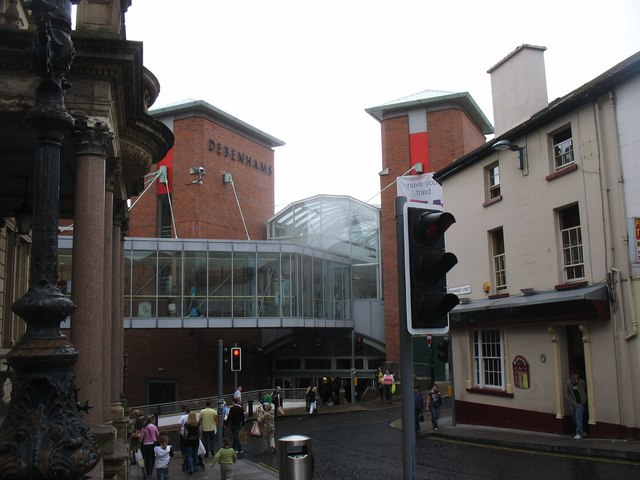
Orchard Street/Newmarket Street Entrance

Level 1 of Foyleside consists of a basement service area for incoming stock deliveries by lorry and a security office. An Iceland supermarket and an Umi Asian restaurant are the sole ground floor units along Foyle Street. There is an entrance on Foyle street and access to toilets, disabled shopper services, an escalator and an elevator to Level 2. Level 2, Level 3 and Level 4 are the main shopping levels.

=== Level 2 ===
Level 2 has an entrance leading to Orchard Street and is a primary walking point to the nearby Richmond Centre shopping centre. This level is used for events and promotions in the centre atrium of the centre. A water fountain feature was removed in 2016. The water fountain had previously been used as a temporary elevated stage platform for events until its removal. There are various centre amenities such as lottery kiosk, a Costa Coffee stall, two ATMs and various other pop ups. The original two floor Marks & Spencer anchor unit was reduced in size in 2007 only occupying a Level 2 presence after refurbishment.

=== Level 3 ===
Level 3 features a glass tunnel ceiling creating a pleasant, bright and airy atmosphere common in most shopping centres from the 1990s. In the late 1990s, the Level 3 mall was extended to accommodate a new Virgin Megastores (now DV8) unit and a glass tunnel walkway which led to the top floor of the West car park. Level 3 is also where the Food Quarter is located which was added as an extension on top of the West Car Park in 2008. There is a glazed walkway bridge which leads to Frasers and Sports Direct which was added in 2004 which was originally for the Debenhams extension. Located close to the Food Quarter is an open barber shop and hair salon as well as a photo printing service stall. In 2011 a new H&M store was opened, merging the former Argos, D2 and Burton units into one large unit at a cost of £5 million. In December 2024, a new 8,000 sq ft Mango store opened in the former Eason unit which had been empty since the retailer closed all their Northern Irish stores in 2020, creating 10 new jobs.

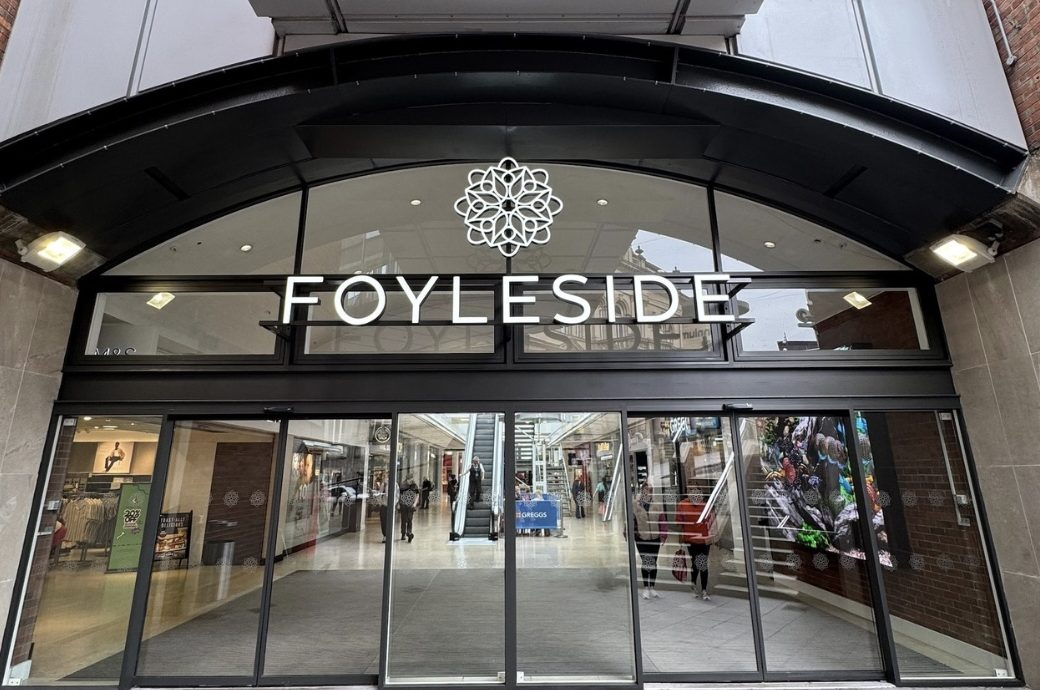
Level 2 Newmarket Street entrance

=== Level 4 ===
Level 4 is the top shopping level of the centre. It was originally the Food Quarter as evident by the original tenants: McDonald's, Café Kylemore and a sweet cart - later to be joined by Thornton's and Joe Jackson's ice cream shop. The Food Quarter moved to Level 3 in 2008 and over time a mix of retail and food outlets now occupy this level. A glazed roof tunnel spans from the centre atrium and dome above this floor maintaining the same bright and open mall atmosphere as other levels. There are often concessions in the centre of this level such as new car placements and pop-up stalls. Level 4 has an entrance leading to Carlisle Road and Bridge Street. This entrance is the site where many local city tours congregate. There are toilet facilities on this level and a family baby change room.

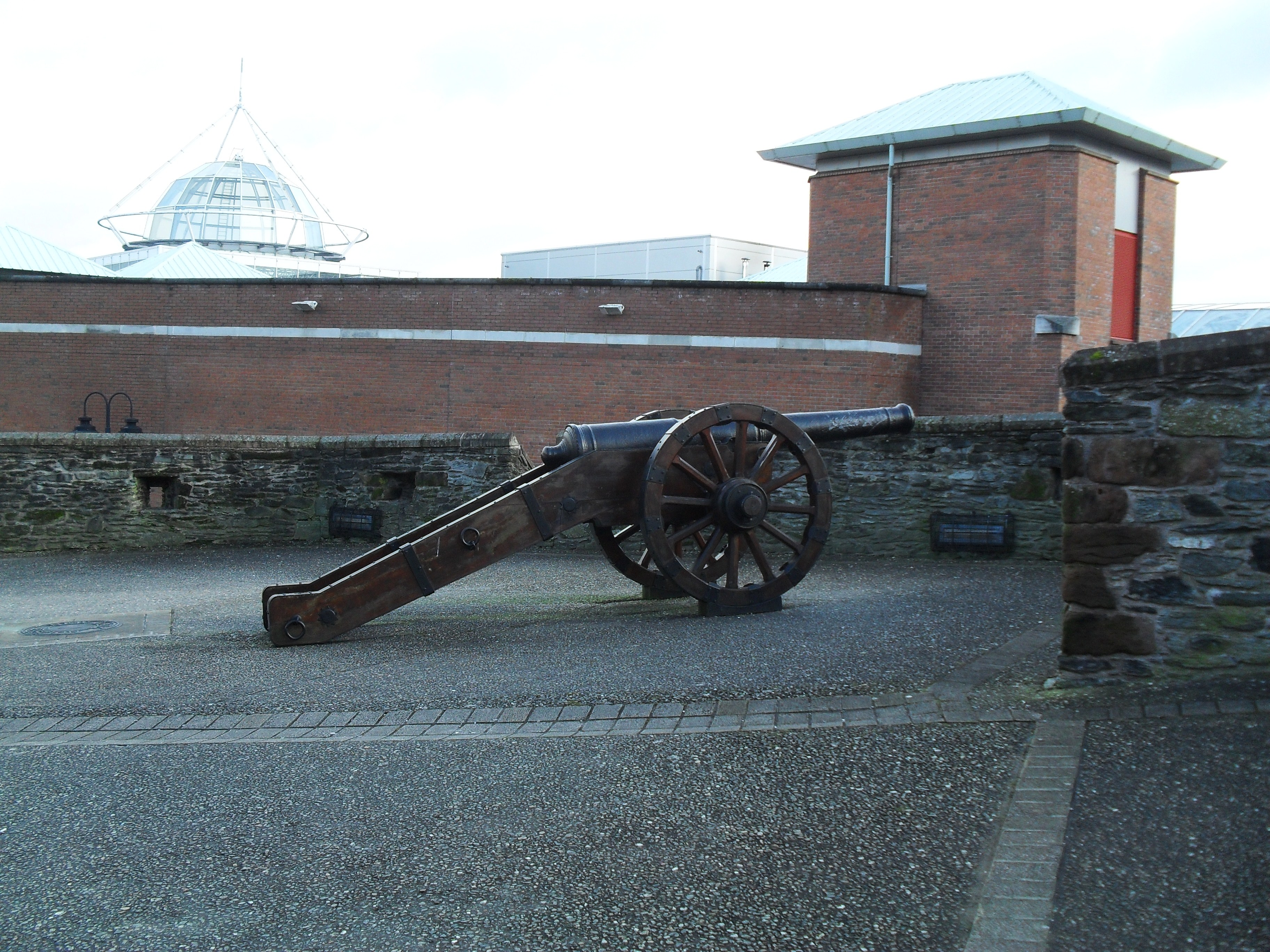
The Centre's dome, a landmark of Derry's skyline viewed from the City Walls

== Parking ==
Foyleside has two on premise parking facilities. Opened in 1995 along with the centre is Foyleside West Car Park, The West Car Park is adjoined and integrated into the main shopping centre although is an independent reinforced concrete structure. Foyleside East Car Park was opened later and is joint to the main shopping centre by a glazed walkway bridge. The total parking capacity of the centre is 1,520 car parking spaces in a multi-storey format.

A local car valeting service operates in both car parks offering car wash, valet and parking for shoppers.

Between 2020 and 2022 and since 2024, the East Car Park has offered a 24-hour service.

== Incidents ==
During the construction of the Debenhams extension in 2003 a construction worker was killed by a falling staircase.

In 2006 during renovation work at the former Kylemore Café on Level 4 to add an additional mezzanine floor for a new River Island store, considerable noise and disruption upset nearby residents. Similar concerns were shared in 2008 when the Food Quarter expansion was built. The centre responded by offering to meet with concerned residents and assured the public that it was carrying out the work according to Road Service and noise regulations.

On 11 September 2016 a nearby lorry which was servicing a Poundland retail location was left unattended early in the morning. A local man had climbed into the lorry and released the handbrake, causing it to roll back unattended along Newmarket Street and it crashed into Foyleside, damaging the Debenhams glass tunnel bridge and the corner of a fire exit stairwell. This was repaired and no major damage or injuries occurred. The person responsible was later prosecuted.

There have been various reports of sexual activity happening in the Foyle Street toilet facilities of the centre. In 2016 wooden panels were installed at these facilities in an attempt to curb this activity. Centre management have increased cleaning and monitoring activity across the centre in response to this issue and actively welcome any report of issues from visitors. There have been numerous prosecutions of people engaging in this activity with Foyleside cited as the location of the incident.
