= Richmond Centre =

Richmond Centre can refer to:

Electoral district

- Richmond Centre (provincial electoral district), a riding of the Legislative Assembly of British Columbia
- Richmond Centre (federal electoral district), a riding of the House of Commons of Canada

Shopping Centres

- Richmond Centre (mall), a shopping mall in Richmond, British Columbia, Canada
- Richmond Centre (Derry), a shopping centre in Derry, Northern Ireland
