= SU carburettor =

Carburettor manufactured in Britain

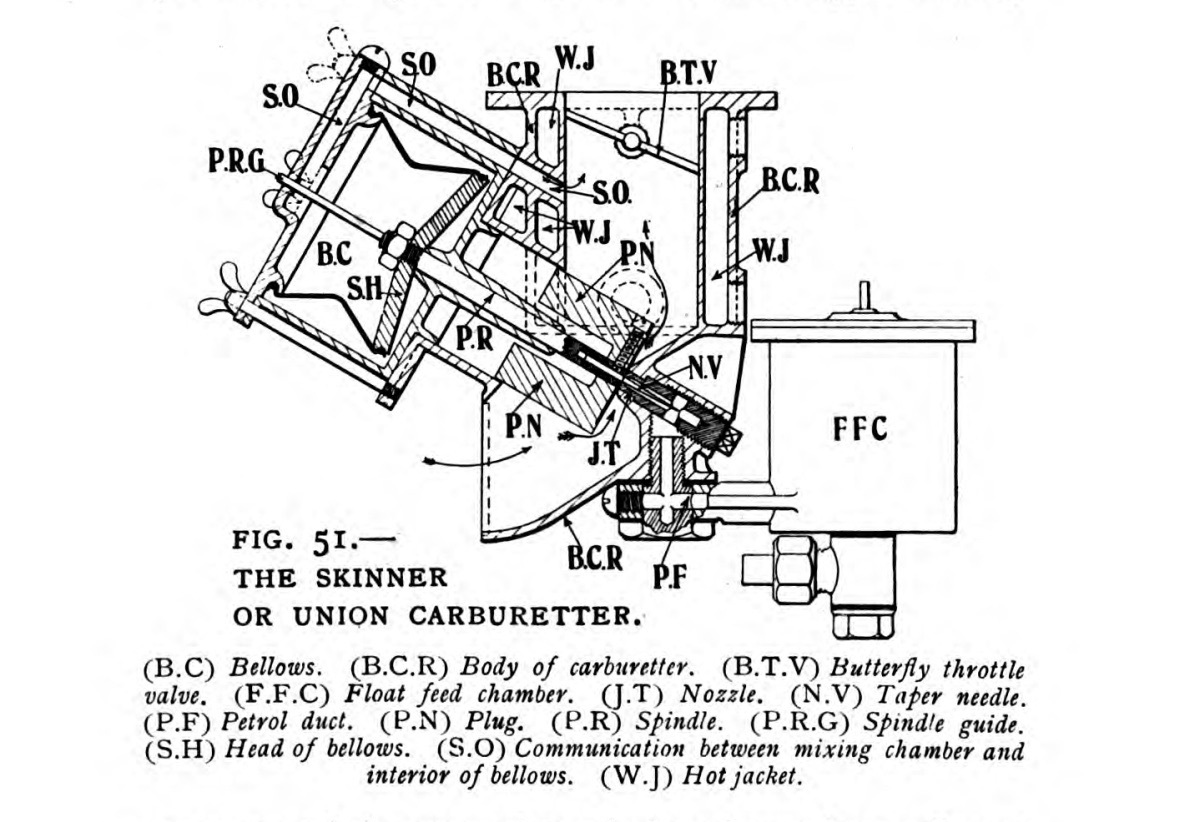
Original design incorporating a leather bellows which was replaced by a piston. This image was published 1908 and 1909

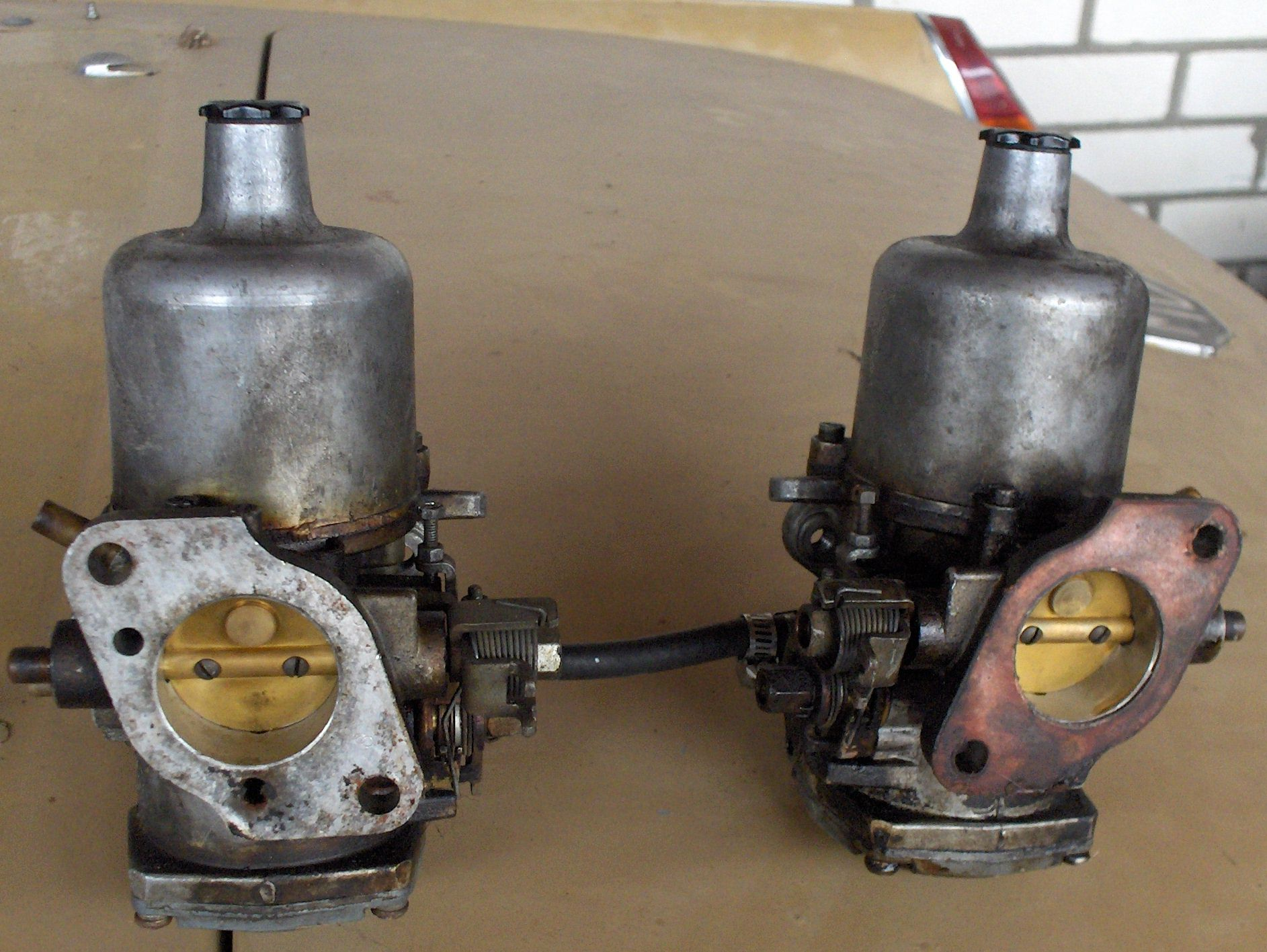
A pair of SU carburettors from an MGB

The SU carburettor is a constant-depression carburettor that was made by a British manufacturer of that name or its licensees in various designs spanning most of the twentieth century.

The S.U. Carburetter Company Limited also manufactured dual-choke updraft carburettors for aero-engines such as the Rolls-Royce Merlin and Rolls-Royce Griffon.

== Invention and development ==
Herbert Skinner (1872–1931), pioneer motorist and an active participant in the development of the petrol engine, invented his Union carburettor in 1904. His much younger brother, Carl (Thomas Carlisle) Skinner (1882–1958), also a motoring enthusiast, had joined the Farman Automobile Co in London in 1899. He helped Herbert to develop the carburettor. Herbert's son could remember his mother sewing the first leather bellows. It was given on loan to The Science Museum, South Kensington in 1934.

In 1905, Herbert applied for a patent, which was granted in early 1906. Later, Carl sold his interest in footwear business Lilley & Skinner and became a partner in G Wailes & Co of Euston Road, London, manufacturers of their carburettor. Herbert continued to develop and patent improvements through to the 1920s, including the replacement of the leather bellows by a brass piston, even though he was a full-time director and divisional manager of Lilley & Skinner.

== S. U. Company Limited ==
S. U. Company Limited — Skinner-Union — was incorporated in August 1910 (Note: S. U. Company Limited, 386—388 Euston Road, N.W. Capital £5,000 in £1 shares. Formed to acquire from G. H. Skinner certain inventions relating to carburettors for motorcars &c New Companies Registered. Private Companies. The Automotor Journal, 24 September 1910) to acquire Herbert's carburettor inventions, and it began manufacture of the carburettors in a factory at Prince of Wales Road, Kentish Town, in North London. Sales were slow.

Following the outbreak of war in 1914, carburettor production nearly stopped, with the factory making machine gun parts and some aircraft carburettors. With peace in 1918, production resumed, but sales remained slow and the company was not profitable, so Carl Skinner approached his customer, W. R. Morris, and managed to sell him the business. Carl Skinner (T. C. Skinner) became a director of Morris's privately held empire, and remained managing director of S.U. until he retired in 1948 aged 65. Production was moved to the W. R. Morris-owned Wolseley factory at Adderley Park, Birmingham. In 1936, W. R. Morris sold many of his privately held businesses, including S. U., to his listed company, Morris Motors.

== The S. U. Carburetter Company Limited ==
Manufacture continued, then by The S. U. Carburetter Company Limited, which was incorporated 15 September 1936, as part of the Morris Organisation, later known as the Nuffield Organisation. The companybecame a subsidiary of British Leyland, and traded under the name SU Carburetters.

The S. U. Carburetter Company Limited of 1936 was voluntarily liquidated in December 1994.

In 1996, the name and rights were acquired by Burlen Fuel Systems Limited of Salisbury, which incorporated an entirely new company with the name The S.U. Carburetter Company Limited, which continues to manufacture carburettors, pumps and components, mainly for the classic car market.

Relocating

== Operating principle ==
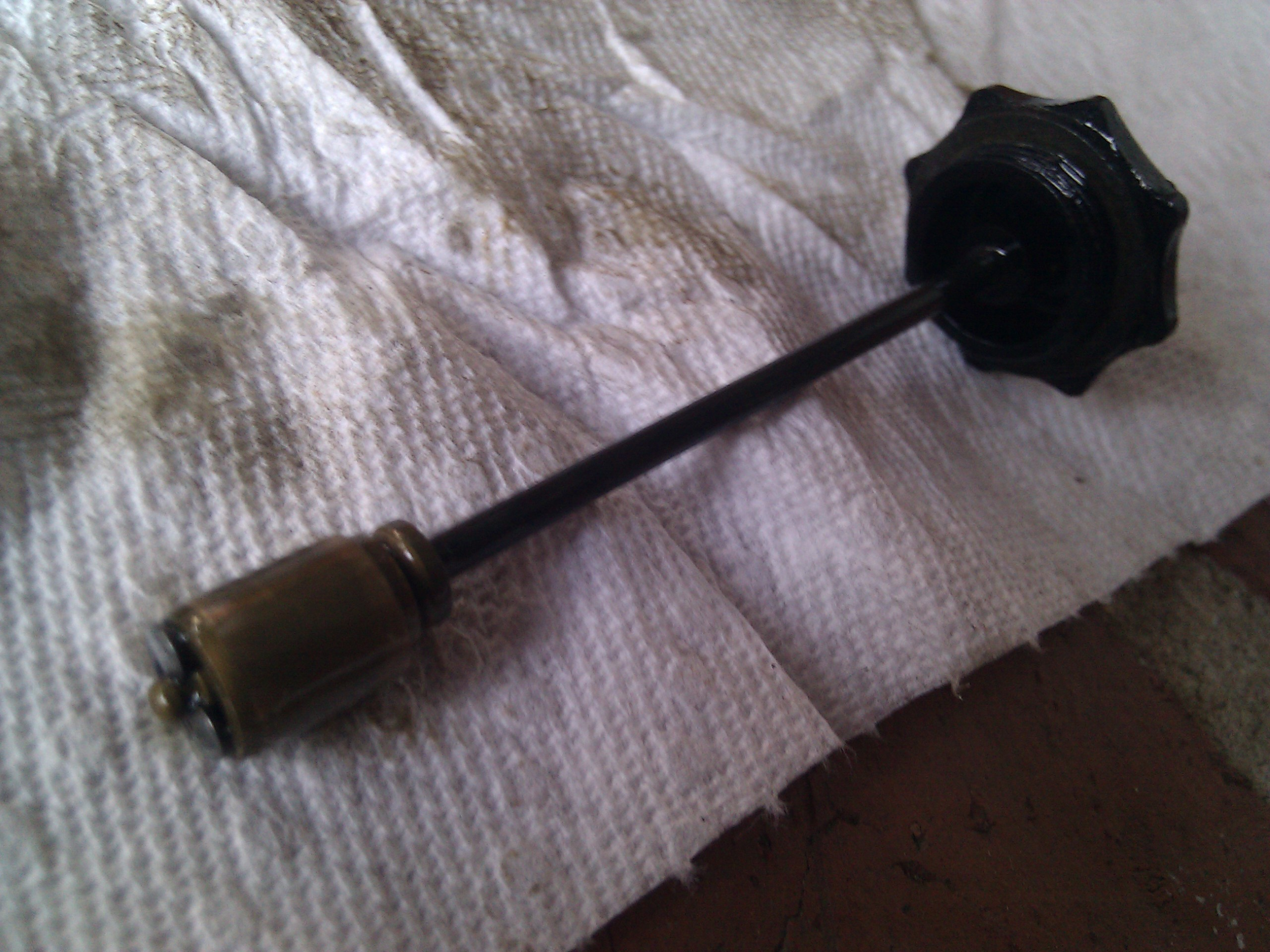
HS6 damper

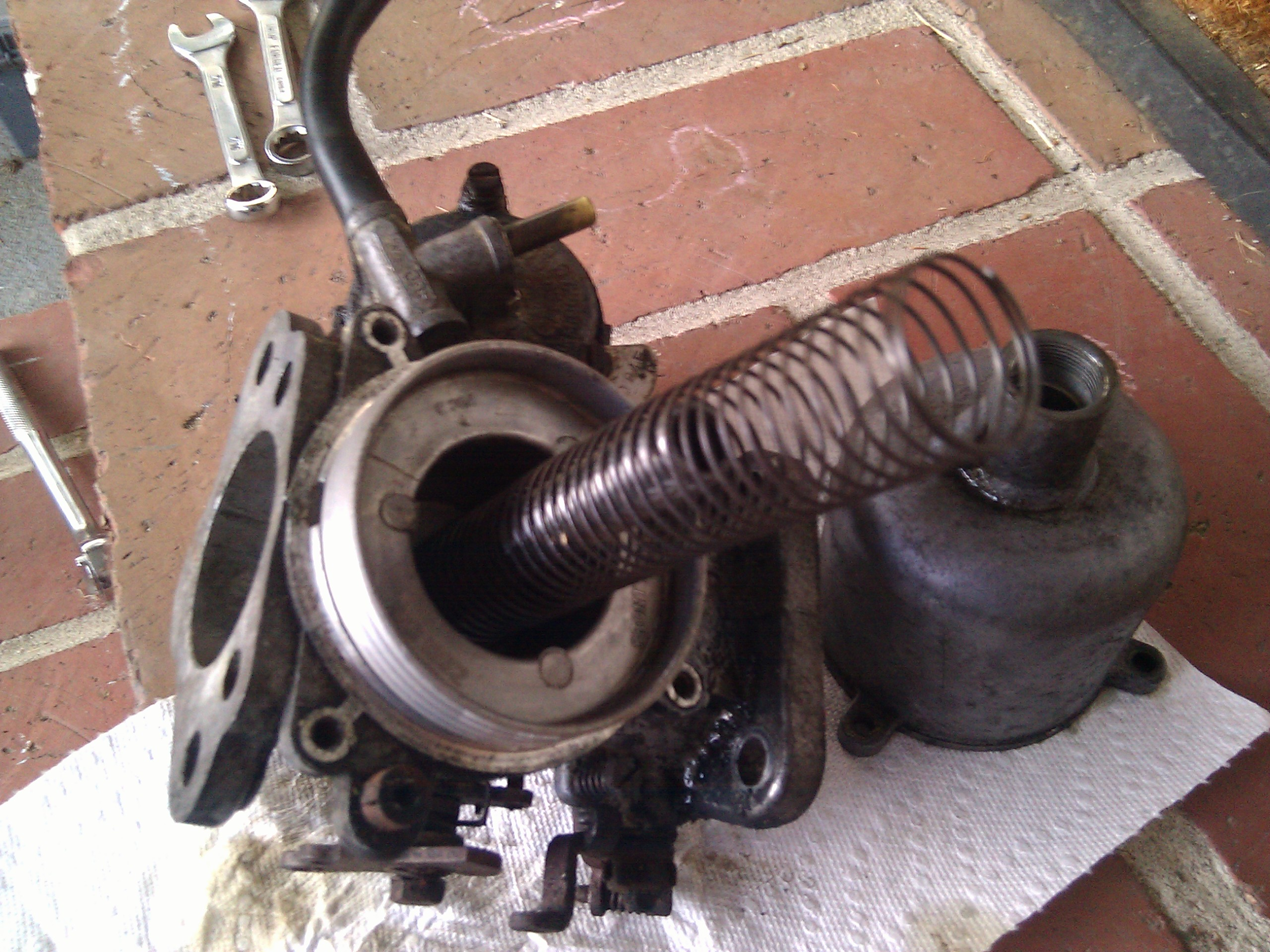
HS6 without dashpot

SU carburettors feature a variable venturi controlled by a sliding piston type air valve. This piston/air valve has a tapered, conical metering rod attached to it (usually referred to as a "needle") that fits inside an orifice ("jet") which admits fuel into the airstream passing through the carburettor. Since the needle is tapered, as it rises and falls it alters the open area of the fuel jet, regulating the passage of fuel, so the movement of the piston controls the amount of fuel delivered, depending on engine demand. The exact dimensions of the taper are tailored during engine development.

The flow of air through the venturi creates a reduced static pressure in the venturi. This pressure drop is communicated to the upper side of the piston via an air passage. The underside of the piston is open to atmospheric pressure. The difference in pressure between the two sides lifts the piston. Opposing this are the weight of the piston and the force of a spring that is compressed by the piston rising. Because the spring is operating over a very small part of its possible range of extension, its force is approximately constant. Under steady state conditions the upwards and downwards forces on the piston are equal and opposite, and the piston does not move.

If the airflow into the engine is increased - by opening the throttle plate (also known as the "butterfly"), or by allowing the engine revs to rise with the throttle plate at a constant setting - the pressure drop in the venturi increases, the pressure above the piston falls, and the piston is pushed upwards, increasing the size of the venturi, until the pressure drop in the venturi returns to its nominal level. Similarly if the airflow into the engine is reduced, the piston will fall. The result is that the pressure drop in the venturi remains the same regardless of the speed of the airflow - hence the name "constant depression" for carburettors operating on this principle - but the piston rises and falls according to the rate of air delivery.

Since the position of the piston controls the position of the needle in the jet and thus the open area of the jet, while the depression in the venturi sucking fuel out of the jet remains constant, the rate of fuel delivery is always a definite function of the rate of air delivery. The precise nature of the function is determined by the profile of the needle. With appropriate selection of the needle, the fuel delivery can be matched much more closely to the demands of the engine than is possible with the more common fixed-venturi carburettor, an inherently inaccurate device whose design must incorporate many complex fudges to obtain usable accuracy of fuelling. The well-controlled conditions under which the jet is operating also make it possible to obtain good and consistent atomisation of the fuel under all operating conditions.

This self-adjusting nature makes the selection of the maximum venturi diameter (colloquially, but inaccurately, referred to as "choke size") much less critical than with a fixed-venturi carburettor.

To prevent erratic and sudden movements of the piston it is hydraulicaly damped by light oil (20W Grade) in a dashpot, which requires periodic replenishment. The damping is asymmetrical: it heavily resists upwards movement of the piston. This serves as the equivalent of an "accelerator pump" transient enrichening device on traditional carburettors by temporarily increasing the speed of air through the venturi when the throttle is suddenly opened, thus increasing the richness of the mixture. Earlier versions of the SU, those made prior to roughly 1955 did not have the hydraulic damper dashpot device.

SU carburettors do not have a conventional choke/strangler flap, which in many fixed-jet carburettor enriches the mixture for starting the engine from cold by restricting the air supply upstream of the venturi. Instead a mechanism lowers the jet assembly, which has the same effect as the needle rising in normal operation - increasing the supply of fuel so that the carburettor will deliver an enriched mixture at all engine speeds and throttle positions. The 'choke' mechanism on an SU carburettor usually also incorporates a system for holding the throttle plate slightly open to raise the engine's idling speed and prevent stalling at low speeds due to a rich mixture. Some SU carburettor applications use a separate automatic cold starting device to provide extra enrichment.

The beauty of the SU lies in its simplicity and lack of multiple jets and ease of adjustment. Adjustment is accomplished by altering the starting position of the jet relative to the needle on a fine screw (26TPI for most pre-HIF versions). At first sight, the principle appears to bear a similarity to that of the slide carburettor, which was previously used on many motorcycles. The slide carburettor has the same piston and main needle as an SU carburettor, however the piston/needle position is directly actuated by a physical connection to the throttle cable rather than indirectly by venturi airflow as with an SU carburettor. This piston actuation difference is the significant distinction between a slide and an SU carburettor. The piston in a slide carburettor is controlled by the operator's demands rather than the demands of the engine. This means that the metering of the fuel can be inaccurate unless the vehicle is travelling at a constant speed at a constant throttle setting - conditions rarely encountered except on motorways. This inaccuracy results in fuel waste, particularly as the carburettor must be set slightly rich to avoid a lean condition (which can cause engine damage). For this reason Japanese motorcycle manufacturers ceased to fit slide carburettors and substituted constant-depression carburettors, which are essentially miniature SUs. It is also possible - indeed, easy - to retrofit an SU carburettor to a bike that was originally manufactured with a slide carburettor, and obtain improved fuel economy and more tractable low-speed behaviour.

One of the downsides of the constant depression carburettor is in high performance applications. Since it relies on restricting air flow in order to produce enrichment during acceleration, the throttle response lacks punch. By contrast, the fixed choke design adds extra fuel under these conditions using its accelerator pump.

== SU carburettor types ==
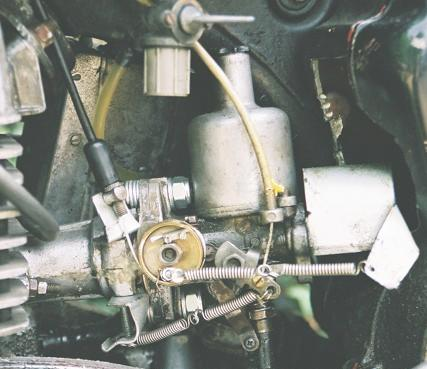
An SU fitted to an MZ in place of the original BVF slide carb

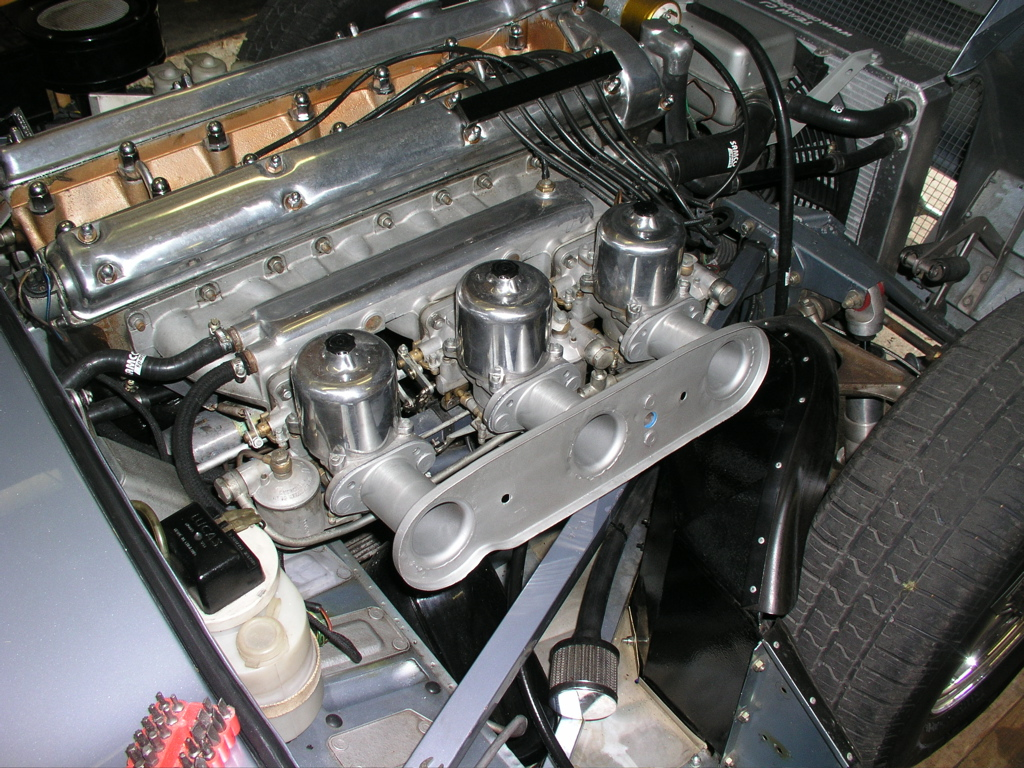
Three 2-inch SU HD8 carburettors as installed on an E-type Jaguar

SU carburettors were supplied in several throat sizes in both Imperial (inch) and metric (millimetre) measurement.

The carburettor identification is made by letter prefix which indicates the float type:

"H": introduced in 1937 in which the float bowl has an arm cast into its base, which mounts to the bottom of the carburettor with a hollow bolt or banjo fitting. Fuel passes through the arm into the carburettor body. The bolt attaches to the carburettor body just behind the main jet assembly.

"HD": introduced in 1954 with the float bowl mounted with its arm fastening directly below, and concentric with, the main jet. The arm has a flange that fastens with 4 screws to the bottom of the carburettor, and sealed with a rubber diaphragm integral with the main jet.

"HS": introduced in 1958 the float bowl can be rigidly or rubber mounted to the main body, fuel is transferred by an external flexible pipe to the jet. The jet moves down to enrich the mixture for cold starting, when the 'choke' linkage is pulled.

"HIF": (1972) the float bowl is horizontal and integral (hence the name) Horizontal Integral Float. Example: 1972-1974 MGB.

"HV" (1929), "OM" and "KIF" types also exist but were less commonly employed.

The Imperial sizes include 1-1/8", 1-1/4", 1-1/2", 1-3/4", 1-7/8", and 2", although not every type (H, HD, HS, HIF) was offered in every size.

There were also H models made in 2-1/4" and 2-1/2", now obsolete. Special purpose-built carburettors (Norman) were made as large as 3".

To determine the throat size from the type number: If the final number (after one, two or three letters, beginning with H) has 1 digit, multiply this number by 1/8", then add 1". For example, if the type number is HS6, the final number is 6: 6/8 = 3/4", add 1, total is 1-3/4", etc.

If the final number has 2 digits, it is the throat size in mm. For example, if the type number is HIF38, the final number is 38, size is 38 mm etc.

== Applications ==
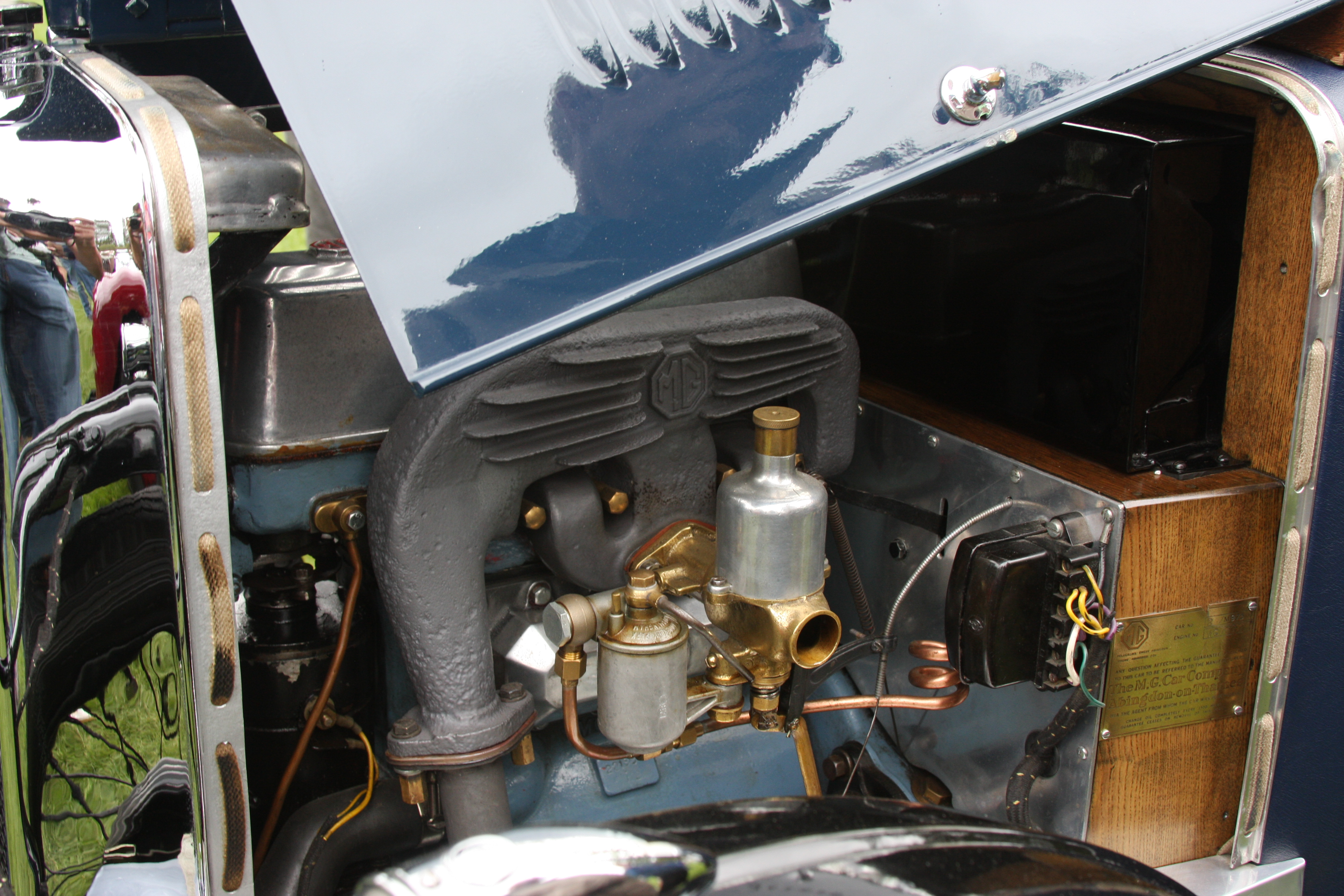
An HV type carburettor fitted to a 1930 MG M-type

S.U. carburettors were widely used not only in Morris's Morris and MG products but such British makes as Rolls-Royce, Bentley, Rover, Riley, Turner, Austin, Jaguar, Aston Martin and Triumph, and Swedish Volvo, for much of the twentieth century, the vast majority of these marques being owned by Morris and its successors, BMC, BL, Rover group etc.

S.U. also produced carburettors for aircraft engines including the early versions of the Rolls-Royce Merlin, but these were of the conventional fixed-jet updraught type rather than the firm's patented constant-depression design.

Standard S.U. carburettors were also a popular upfit for Harley-Davidson motorcycles, given their space saving "side draft" design and superior ability to self-compensate for changes in air density/altitude. Many owners replaced the stock Linkert, Bendix or Keihin carbs with SU's until the Keihin Constant Velocity carb became stock in 1990.

S.U. carburettors remained on production cars through to 1994 in the Mini and the Maestro, by which time the company had become part of the Rover Group.

Hitachi also built under SU license carburettors based on the SU design which were used on the Datsun 240Z, Datsun 260Z and other Datsun Cars. While these appear the same, only their needles are interchangeable.

== Competitors ==
Having realised its benefits, a number of other carburettor manufacturers adopted the SU constant velocity/constant vacuum/variable venturi principles, either under licence from SU as in the case of Hitachi or by making detail changes to the design to avoid patent infringement, these include the Stromberg CD (constant depression) introduced in the early 1960s, the Ford/Motorcraft VV (variable venturi) introduced in the 1980s and the Keihin CV (constant vacuum) and the Bing CV (constant vacuum) carburettors widely used on Japanese and BMW motorcycles. None have been as successful as the SU design.

It seems very likely that SU manufactured carburettors would have been much more widely used but for the fact that SU was owned by Morris cars, later BMC and British Leyland/Rover group. Other major car manufacturers perhaps felt they couldn't be seen to be using carburettors produced by one of their competitors and possibly BMC/BL/Rover preferred to keep the benefits for their own products or couldn't supply sufficient volume for the likes of Ford. Strangely Triumph cars, who were part of the BMC organisation, often fitted the competing Stromberg CD carburettors, possibly for reasons of internal politics although the Stromberg CD was also used on the Jaguar xj12 for emissions control reasons.

== SU fuel pumps ==
In 1929 SU introduced the Petrolift electric fuel pump, which could be fitted as a substitute for the vacuum type pumps common at the time. This was superseded in 1932 by the L type fuel pump with the brass body, which used a solenoid to operate a diaphragm pump.

== See also ==
- Amal (carburettor)
- Zenith carburettor
