= Lilley & Skinner =

British shoe retailer

Lilley & Skinner Ltd
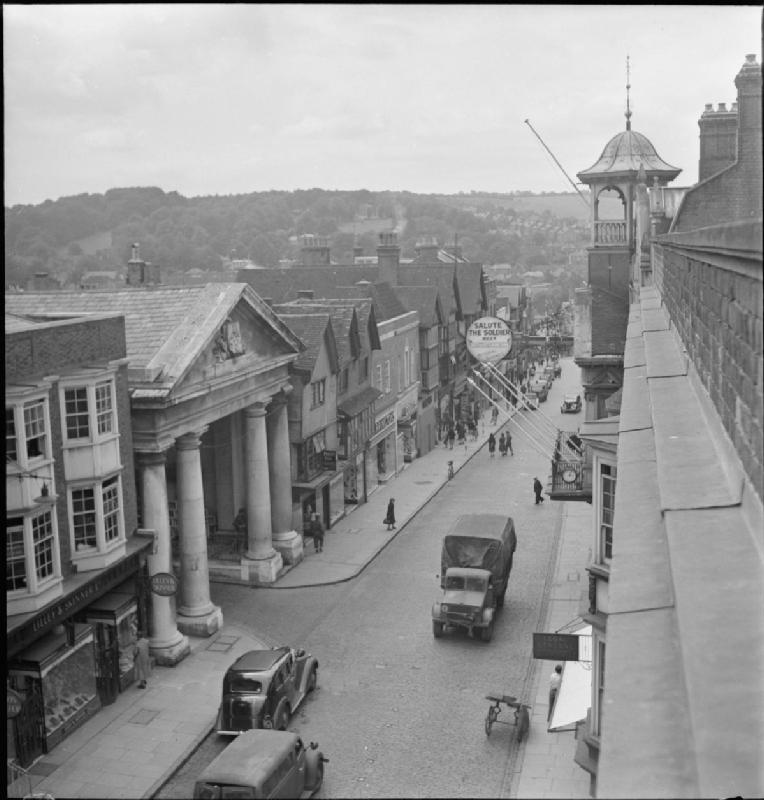
- Lilley & Skinner shop (near left), Guildford, 1945
- Industry: Fashion
- Founded: 1835; 191 years ago in Southwark, London, England
- Founder: Thomas Lilley
- Defunct: 1962
- Fate: Bought by British Shoe Corporation, subsidiary of Sears plc
- Products: Shoes

Lilley & Skinner was a British mid-market shoe brand, manufacturer, retailer and wholesale distributor of their own and others' boots and shoes and associated chain of high street shoe shops. It was also active in wholesale leather distribution.

== History ==
Lilley & Skinner's origins were in a shoe shop opened in London's Southwark in 1835 by London boot and shoe manufacturer, Thomas Lilley (1814-1899). By the mid 19th century Lilley had opened factories in Wellingborough, Irthlingborough, Higham Ferrers and Rushden in Northamptonshire. In April 1871 he reported 233 employees to the census. More shops were opened in the 1870s and the headquarters moved to Paddington Green.

In 1881 Thomas Lilley (1845-1916), only surviving son of the founder, went into partnership with his sister's husband of ten years, W. Banks Skinner (1847-1914), and they named their business Lilley & Skinner. To own it they incorporated Lilley & Skinner Limited in 1894 and sold listed preference shares in 1896. By then there were agencies in Melbourne Australia and Port Elizabeth South Africa.

By the end of the First World War, it was one of the UK's best known shoe brands. Lilley & Skinner opened what was believed to be the world's largest shoe shop in Oxford Street in 1921.

Control of the business was opened up just before he died by the grandson of the founder, chairman Thomas Lilley (1872-1951) with a public listing of ordinary shares to establish a value for the 80 per cent estate duty. His elder son Thomas Lilley (1902-1959) and his brother James (1909-1992) were at that time directors along with William Banks Skinner's grandson, John Hershell Skinner (1909-1982) son of John Hershell Skinner (1884-1947). All but one long-serving member of the directorate, Stanley Thorp, were family members and all were active in the management of the business.

In 1956, it merged with Saxone Shoe Co to give them a combined 470 retail outlets, with Saxone Shoe being renamed Saxone, Lilley & Skinner (Holdings) Limited and becoming the parent company. Saxone specialised in men's and children's shoes compared to the fashion products of Lilley & Skinner. Saxone stores were mainly operating in Scotland, Ireland and the North of England whereas Lilley & Skinner stores were mainly in the South of England plus the subsidiary, Benefit, concentrating on the Midlands.

The merged company became part of the British Shoe Corporation, a subsidiary of Sears plc, in 1962, but that was broken up in the 1990s, and Lilley & Skinner became part of Stead & Simpson.

Lilley & Skinner shoes are in the V&A collection.

== See also ==
- George Herbert Skinner (1872-1931), director of Lilley & Skinner, inventor of the SU Carburetter, grandson of Thomas Lilley (1814-1899) the founder
- Herbert Wakefield Banks Skinner (1900-1960), FRS British physicist, son of George Herbert Skinner
