= BNP Paribas Personal Finance UK =

British financial firm

BNP Paribas Personal Finance
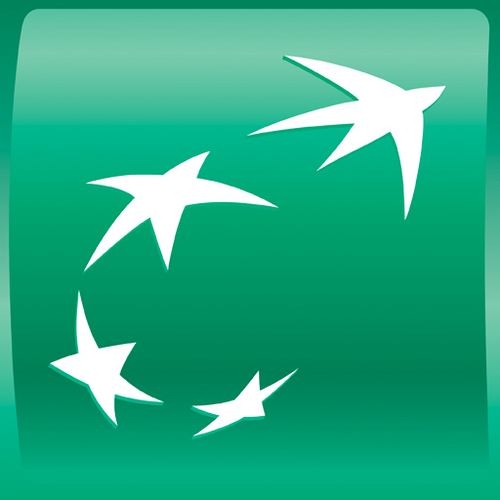
- Formerly: LaSer UK
- Company type: Subsidiary
- Industry: Financial services
- Founded: 21 January 1973; 52 years ago
- Founder: Selfridges
- Headquarters: Solihull, West Midlands, United Kingdom
- Area served: United Kingdom and Ireland
- Products: Consumer finance, Retail Finance, Credit Cards, Affinity Loans, Premium Finance
- Number of employees: 740 (2017)
- Parent: BNP Paribas
- Website: www.bnpparibas-pf.co.uk

BNP Paribas Personal Finance, formerly known as LaSer UK, is a British and Irish provider of consumer finance. It operates in the UK and in the Republic of Ireland. The company administers credit and loyalty programmes for other businesses across multiple sectors, including retail, household, insurance, entertainment and leisure. BNP Paribas Personal Finance manages four million customers and 300 UK partnerships. As of 2016, it had financed £1.6 billion in credit.

The company's operations are in Solihull and Belfast, where it employs 740 people.

BNP Paribas Personal Finance consists of two separate companies Creation Financial Services Limited, and Creation Consumer Finance Limited, collectively trading under the name of Creation. BNP Paribas Personal Finance is fully owned by the France-based BNP Paribas.

== History ==
The company began its existence in 1973 as the financial services arm of Selfridges department store providing credit to its customers. The company eventually became SearsCard, with its primary function to provide store card facilities for retail companies within the Sears PLC Group.

In the late nineties, the company was rebranded as Creation Financial Services Ltd.

In 1999, Creation Financial Services Ltd. was acquired by LaSer, a European provider of credit and loyalty customer programmes based in Paris, jointly owned by BNP Paribas and Galeries Lafayette.

In 2004, Creation expanded into co-brand credit cards with the launch of a number of programmes with football clubs, providing credit cards to clubs in the Premiership and Football League Championship.

In 2006, Creation acquired Belfast-based Open and Direct Retail Services (ODRS).

In 2007, the LaSer Group was formed by Creation's parents, including rebranding the group companies across Europe and LaSer UK was formed. In 2008, it in-sourced its customer services and collections teams.

In 2010 LaSer UK announced it would be supplying fixed term credit for DSG International the owners of Dixons, Currys and PC World.

In 2012 LaSer UK announced a partnership with retailer Asda, to provide the Asda Money Credit Card. The new partnership created 100 new jobs at LaSer UK's Solihull call centre.

In 2017 LaSer UK rebranded itself as BNP Paribas Personal Finance.

== Products ==
BNP Paribas Personal Finance provides consumer finance, including retail point of sale finance, credit cards, affinity loans and insurance premium finance.
