= Richmond Centre (Derry) =

Coordinates: 54.996°N 7.321°W

The Richmond Centre
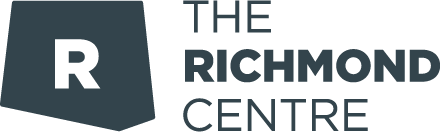

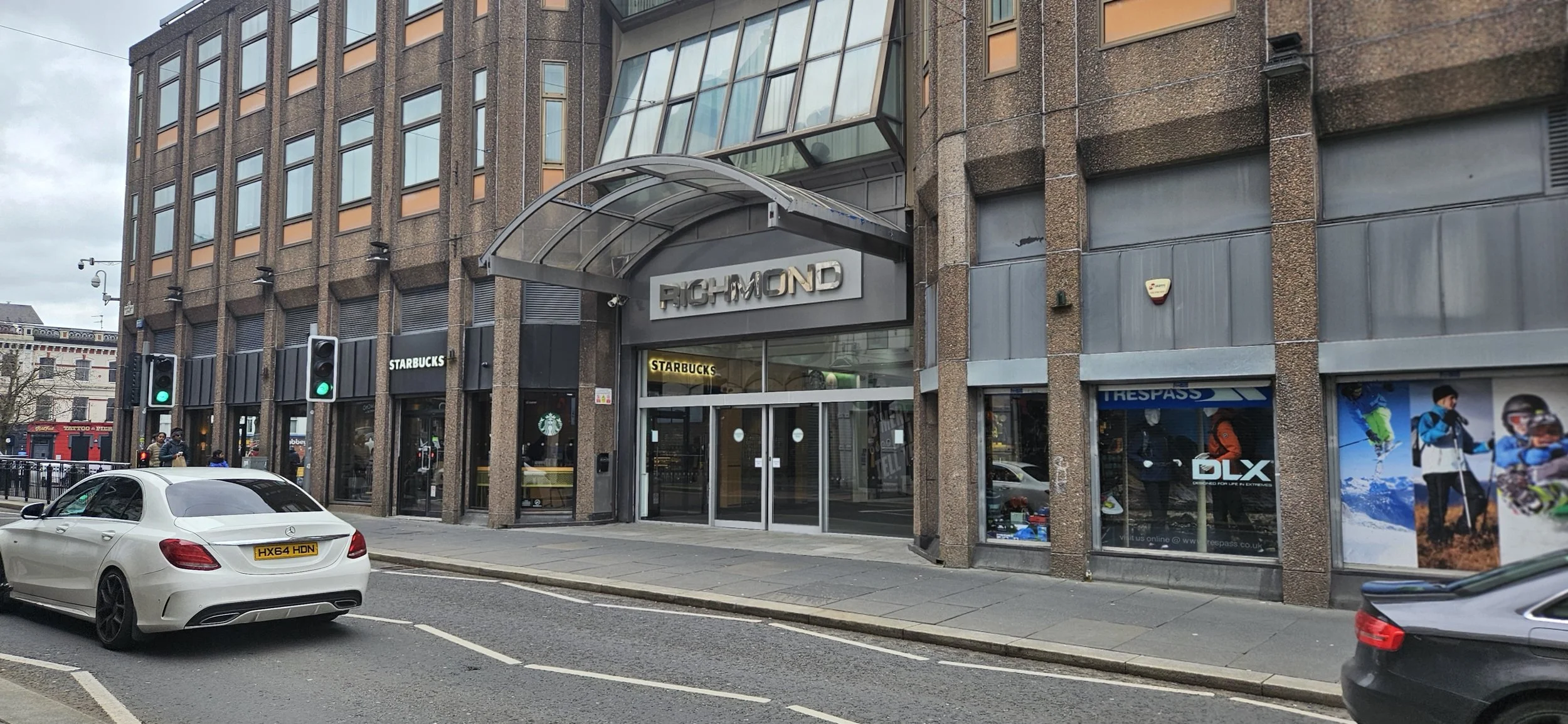
- Location: Derry, Northern Ireland
- Address: Ferryquay Street, Derry, BT48 6PE
- Opened: 14 November 1984
- Developer: Derry City Council
- Owner: Martin Property Group
- Num. of stores: 36
- Num. of anchor tenants: 1
- Floor area: 120,000 sq ft
- Floors: 6 (3 Shopping, 1 Basement, 2 Office)
- Public transit: Derry ~ Londonderry railway station, Ulsterbus
- Website: https://www.richmondcentre.co.uk/

The Richmond Centre is a large shopping centre in Derry, Northern Ireland of 120,000 sq ft (11,000 m^{2}). The centre hosts over 40 retail units, including some major high street names. It was completed in 1984 within the city's historic walls. It was the first major regeneration project in the city, announced by Minister of State Richard Needham, since The Troubles began. It is close to the larger Foyleside shopping centre (400,000 sq ft, completed 1995), which is located approximately 50 metres away.

The centre was originally anchored by Dunnes Stores, however following their closure in 2001, the unit has since been taken over by New Look. Other large retailers in the centre include Nando's, JD Sports, Superdry and Starbucks.

== History ==
The centre opened on 14 November 1984 after more than ten years of planning. The centre cost £10 million and was financed by the UK Government to help stimulate growth in the inner city, whilst creating more than 300 jobs. The centre was constructed using a split level design as it was built on the steepest shopping street in Europe. Boots and Dunnes Stores occupied the larger two units, with 38 smaller units.

The centre's main atrium was a focal point, with the large 'Richmond Mural', designed by Tim Webster occupying a significant portion of the area.

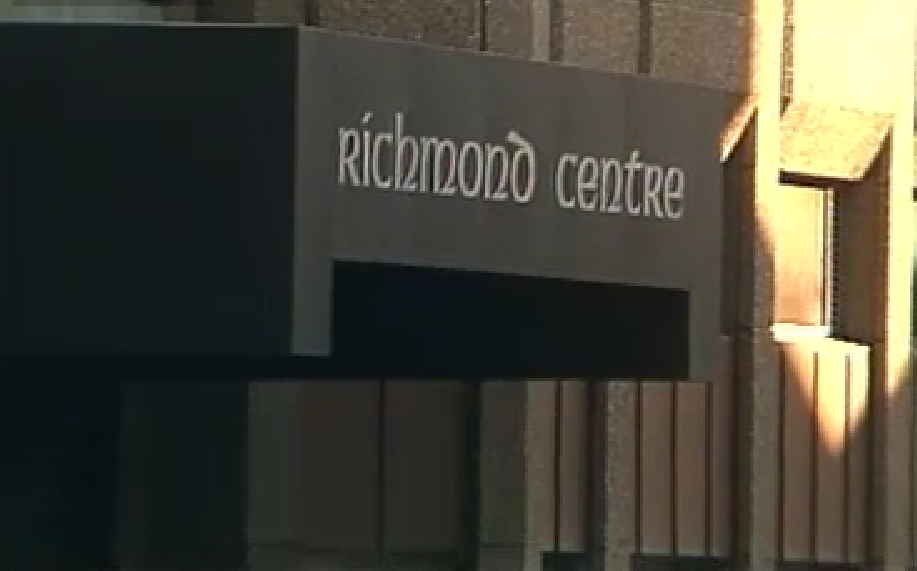
Ferryquay Street entrance, 1987

In 1987, the Derry City Council sold the Richmond Centre to a private developer for £4 million, excluding the big Dunnes Stores unit which had been sold outright to the company two years prior. Due to the strict planning laws within the historic city centre and the long planning battle to construct the centre, the Richmond Centre already had an aging design just three years after opening, resulting in the new owners spending a further £0.8 million upgrading the building.

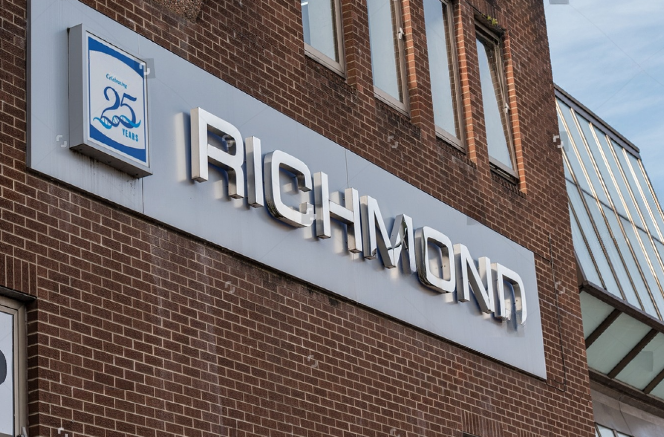
Richmond Centre (2024)

In 1996, UK property group IMPF paid £15.75m for the city centre development. Following this, the new owners carried out a £1.25m facelift to attract three key retailers after the opening of the state- of-the-art Foyleside Shopping Centre which is located nearby.

In June 1999, the development was again sold for £22m to a consortium of private UK-based investors. The sale of the centre was handled by Paddy Brennan, an investment director with Lambert Smith Hampton. On 16 January 2001, Dunnes Stores announced they would be closing their branch in the Richmond Centre. Despite this, the company stated that the store's 18 staff would all be offered alternative employment in outlets at the Foyleside and Springtown shopping centres. The unit was taken over by UK fashion giant New Look a year later.

In 2009, the owner of the Richmond Centre, WG Mitchell, fell into administration. Following this, the administrators Ernst and Young placed the development up for sale with a guide price of £26m. In May 2010, the centre was purchased for £24m, £2m below its guide price by West Register, the assets arm of Royal Bank of Scotland. The sale was handled, on behalf Ernst and Young, by Belfast property agents BTWShiells. Throughout the early 2010s, the centre saw a slump in occupancy, with more than 40% of the centre vacant following the departure of several tenants including Miss Selfridge, Exhibit, Peacocks, Internacionale, Dorothy Perkins, Yankee Candle, Argos and JJB Sports. The centre management blamed this decline in trade on the recession and significant competition from the larger Foyleside Shopping Centre.

In 2015, The Richmond Centre was sold again in a £20m deal. It was snapped up by London asset manager Vixcroft. Daniel Carter, the chief executive of Vixcroft at the time, said: "Our immediate plans are to invest in improvements to the property. This sort of multi-tenanted commercial property asset is not the sort of thing one would want to flip in and out of. It's quite an undertaking to buy an asset like this." In 2017, the new owners began a refurbishment process of the centre by improving lighting, the mall areas and the entrance, with the first phase of work completed before Christmas. The second phase of work including modernisation of the Shipquay Street entrance was completed in March 2018. Throughout 2018 the centre was fully occupied for the first time in its existence, with new tenants such as Clockwork Orange, Yours Clothing and Warren James opening in the development.

== Decline ==
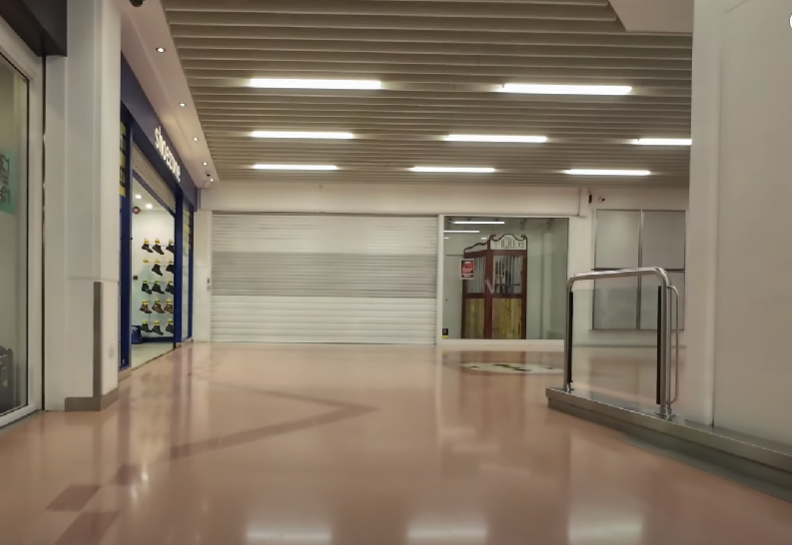
The now closed Level 2 (2022)

The COVID-19 pandemic had a large impact on the centre, with tenants such as Argos, Peacocks and Jack&Jones closing their stores at the centre. In December 2020 Frasers Group announced that the Sports Direct and GAME outlets on Level 2 would be relocating following the decision to purchase the anchor building at Foyleside Shopping Centre previously occupied by Debenhams. In December 2021, a Derry-based investment and development company, Martin Property Group acquired the Richmond Shopping Centre for £18m, with the new owners promising to revitalize the centre in the coming years including a complete renovation of the 1980s facade.

In 2022, the final tenant on Level 2, Shoe Zone closed its doors, this resulted in the entire retail floor being closed to the public except for access to the toilet block. With Martin Property Group promising to attract new tenants to the floor. As of December 2024, the Bonkers children’s play area has been opened where the Sports Direct store once was.

== Revitalization ==
In July 2025, Martin Property Group submitted a multi-million pound application to Derry City & Strabane District Council in regards to the refurbishment of existing east facing façade of shopping centre along Bank Place and Newmarket Street. At the same time, the Richmond Centre announced two new tenants would be opening on level 1, Tesco express in the former Argos unit, which closed in 2020 and Søstrene Grene in the former Soho unit following their move to level 3 in May.

== Mall Levels ==
=== Basement Level ===
The basement level of the Richmond Centre Consists of a staff parking and access point to Bank Place, whilst also containing Staff Toilets and Storage areas .

=== Level 1 ===
Level 1 has an entrance leading to Newmarket Street and Shipquay Street and is a primary walking point to the nearby Foyleside Shopping Centre. The floor is currently occupied by several tenants including Soho, Warren James, Nando's and Caffè Nero. The floor also has escalators and lifts leading to Levels 2, 3 and 4, with an emergency staircase located behind the Shipquay Street Entrance. The level was constructed on the site previously occupied by the former Richmond Street, where the development gets its name.

=== Level 2 ===
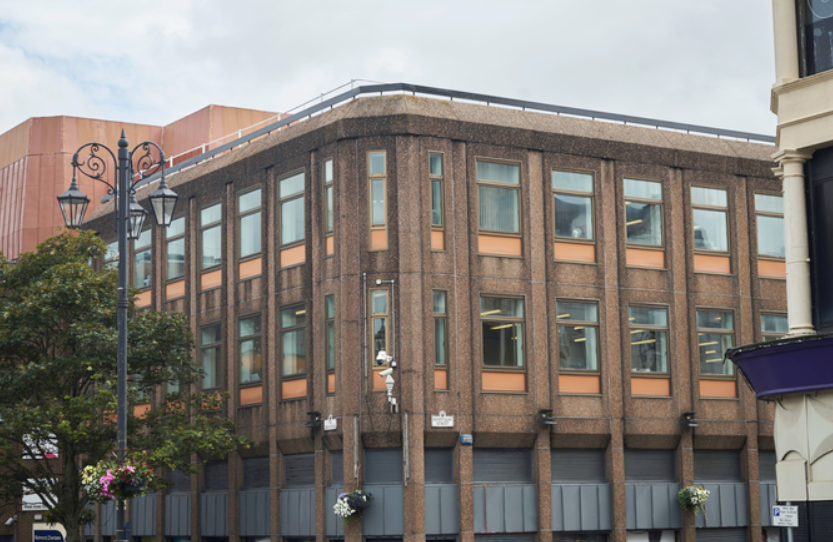
The Richmond Centre as viewed from the Diamond (2022)

Level 2 overlooks both Shipquay Street and Newmarket Street, however lacks a public entrance, instead featuring a large glass window overlooking Castle Street and the city walls. As of December 2024, this level is currently only occupied by the Bonkers children’s play area and two small stalls.

=== Level 3 ===
Level 3 is the main shopping level, at one end the floor features a large glass window and roof overlooking the city centre. The centre's main atrium located on Level 3 was a focal point, with the large 'Richmond Mural', designed by Tim Webster occupying a significant portion of the area which has since been covered. The other side is occupied by an entrance to Ferryquay Street, overlooking the former Austin's Department Store. The floor is anchored by New Look but also contains several other large retail units occupied by JD Sports and Life Style Sports, who offer a split level design. The main goods yard and service bay is located on Level 3 which can be accessed on Newmarket Street and the entrance to Richmond Chambers can be accessed from The Diamond.

=== Level 4/5 (Richmond Chambers) ===
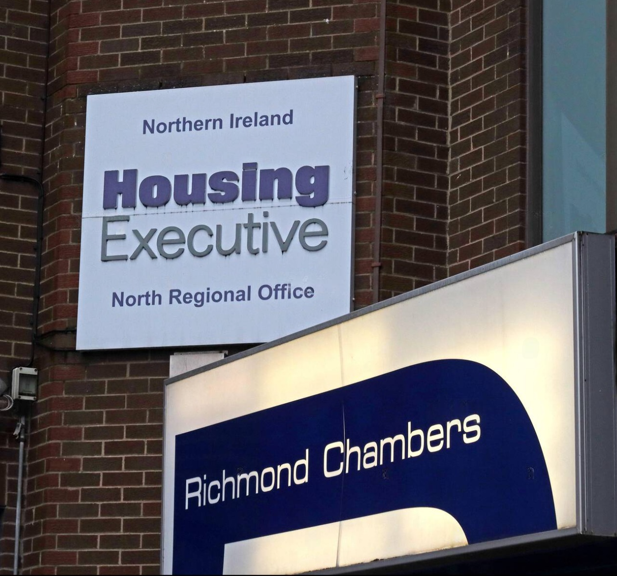
Main Entrance to Richmond Chambers, The Diamond (2023)

Richmond Chambers is the name given to the two floors (43,000 sq ft) of office accommodation located above the main shopping complex. The office space opened in 1984 along with the rest of the development. The Chambers can be accessed through an entrance located on The Diamond or through the Main Lift located within the Shopping Centre. The building is currently occupied by the Civil Service, some representatives from Derry City & Strabane District Council, Labour Relations Agency and operates as the Northern Regional Headquarters for the Housing Executive of Northern Ireland. The Derry Chamber of Commerce and several other independent businesses also reside within the building. However concerns have been raised about the long term viability of the complex as when staff moved out of the building in October 1993 and June 1994, over 10,000 sq. ft (24 per cent) of space remained vacant for over four years. Since August 1998 the unoccupied space has been 4,500 sq ft. (11 per cent). The potential loss of rental income during this period is some £270,000 with a further £160,000 contribution to service charges foregone.

== Parking ==
Due to the Centre's location within the historic core of Derry, surrounded by the city's 17th Century City walls, the decision was taken to not construct a Multi Level Car Park as it would've caused increased congestion within the city centre. Several nearby car parks are available on Bishop Street, Foyle Street and at Foyleside which has two on premise parking facilities. Opened in 1995 along with the centre is Foyleside West Car Park and Foyleside East Car Park which was opened later with a total parking capacity of 1,520 car parking spaces in a multi-storey format.

== Stores ==
As of June 2024, stores in the development include Bonmarché, JD Sports, New Look, Soho, Vodafone, Starbucks and The Works.

== Rail access ==
- Derry~Londonderry Waterside over the Peace Bridge.
