= William Barratt (manufacturer) =

British shoe manufacturer and socialist activist

Arthur William Barratt (8 October 1877 – 8 December 1939) was a British shoe manufacturer and socialist activist, who founded Barratts Shoes.

Born in Northampton, Barratt was the son of John, a working-class shoemaker, and Eleanor Yeomans. After a primary education, he became a shop assistant, selling shoes, and after a while moved to London. He met and married Alice Johnson, and the couple settled in Northampton. Barratt joined the Social Democratic Federation and stood for Northampton Town Council, narrowly missing out on election.

In 1902, Barratt set up a shoe shop with a brother. The following year, he began selling shoes by mail order, and although the shop went bankrupt in 1906, the mail order business proved a success. He set up a large factory in Northampton in 1913, and set up a shop in London the following year, the first of a large chain. The business grew rapidly making boots for the armed forces during World War I, but saw continued success after the war with its large advertising campaigns and reputation for quality.

Barratt remained interested in politics, and from 1929, he served as a Labour Party member of Northampton Town Council. He also stood unsuccessfully in Bethnal Green North East at the 1931 United Kingdom general election. However, in 1934 he resigned from the council, arguing that it operated on an unbusinesslike basis, and took no further part in electoral politics. He served as president of the Northampton Town Boot and Shoe Manufacturers Association from 1933, but was controversial in the industry for arguing for a shorter working week for employees.
