= Dolcis Shoes =

British shoe wear retailer

Dolcis
- Company type: Shoewear
- Founded: 1863; 2012
- Parent: Jacobson Group
- Website: www.dolcis.co.uk

Dolcis Shoes is a shoewear retailer in the United Kingdom that operate online and through retailers. Previously, they owned over 65 standalone shops in the UK and over 150 concessions. Bought by Harvey Jacobson, of the Jacobson Group in 2012, they relaunched their collections the following year to celebrate their 150th anniversary.

== History ==
The company began life on a street barrow in 1863 when John Upson started to sell his shoes on Woolwich Town Market. Business grew, and from the barrow he graduated to his first store in Woolwich called the Great Boot Provider.

In 1920 the company went public and the name Dolcis started to appear over the shop doors. In 1956, it had 250 stores and became part of the British Shoe Corporation, a division of Sears Holdings, and in 1967 was relocated to Leicester. In 1988 Dolcis was chosen by British Shoe Corporation as the pilot company for the installation of EPOS equipment.

In December 1997 the Dolcis business was bought by the Alexon Group and venture capitalist, Electra Fleming, and relocated to Luton. In 2006 Dolcis was sold by Alexon in a deal involving Scottish retail entrepreneur John Kinnaird. Kinnaird unveiled an ambitious plan to refurbish the chain's stores, boost the fashionability of its products and update the brand. Plans were to see 20 shops refitted by the end of 2007, another 20 in the first half of 2008 and the remainder by the end of that year.

At the end of 2007, Dolcis had 65 High Street branches across the UK. In addition to these there were also over 150 Dolcis concessions, primarily within Bay Trading and Envy stores. In 2007 Dolcis began trading online.

== Administration ==
The company was making a loss of £6m a year on the sale of £62m worth of shoes. On 21 January 2008 the retailer fell into administration, partially as a result of the slowdown in spending due to the onset of the credit crunch, which led to a recession. On 13 February 2008 administrators KPMG announced that the brand name Dolcis and 24 of the company's 185 shops had been bought by Stylo Group of Bradford. 800 former Dolcis staff lost their jobs, and the shops were rebranded as Barratts Shoes.

However, the company reformed and relaunched its new online collection in 2012 after being acquired by the Jacobson Group. Dolcis Shoes's then owner, Macintosh Retail Group, was declared bankrupt in December 2015.
