= Sears plc =

British conglomerate

- Type: Conglomerate
- Industry: Retail
- Founded: 1891; 135 years ago
- Defunct: 1999; 27 years ago
- Fate: Acquired by Philip Green
- Successor: Arcadia Group
- Headquarters: London, United Kingdom
- Key people: Charles Clore (chairman)
- Number of employees: 65,000

Sears plc was a large British-based conglomerate. The company was listed on the London Stock Exchange and was once a constituent of the FTSE 100 Index. It was acquired by Charles Clore in the 1950s who expanded the company to be one of the largest retailers in Britain. It was acquired by Philip Green in 1999 who oversaw the break up of the group.

== History ==
The business was founded by John and William Sears in 1891 and initially traded as bootmakers under the name of Trueform.

In 1929 Sears acquired footwear retailers Freeman, Hardy and Willis.

=== Acquisition by Charles Clore ===
The business was acquired by Charles Clore in 1953 for £4 million, by which time it had over 900 shops. In 1954, Sears bought Haverton Holdings for £3.5 million, which owned Furness Shipbuilding Company and a controlling interest in listed hosiery knitting machine manufacturer, Bentley Engineering, in which Clore was a board member. He renamed the group Sears Holdings in 1955 and went on to buy the Manfield and Dolcis shoe shop chains the following year, bringing the total number of shops up to almost 1,500.

=== Creation of British Shoe Corporation and diversification ===
In the late 1950s Clore consolidated all the shoe brands Sears had acquired under the name British Shoe Corporation under which name it also bought the recently merged Saxone Lilley & Skinner, another shoe shop chain with over 500 shops, in 1962. In June 1959, the group acquired the remainder of the Scottish Motor Traction Company for £1.7 million. In August 1959, after already acquiring a controlling interest, they increased their ownership in Mappin & Webb jewelers to 98% for £3 million. In October 1959, Mappin & Webb bought Garrard & Co, the Crown Jeweller, for almost £1 million. The same year, the group also tried to acquire brewer Watney Mann for £20 million. By the year-end, the group divided itself into four sub-divisions (British Shoe Corporation; Engineering; Motor distribution, and Mappin and Webb).

In 1964, the group acquired US linen hire and industrial laundry, Consolidated Industries, which it renamed Sears Industries. Sears Industries later acquired US knitwear manufacturer, Highlander.

=== Purchase of Lewis's department stores and Selfridges ===
Sears decided to invest in department stores in 1965 acquiring Lewis's Investment Trust which itself controlled Selfridges for £63 million. In 1966, Selfridges launched the Miss Selfridge department, which subsequently expanded to a store chain in its own right.

Following large losses, in October 1968, Clore sold the Furness Shipbuilding yard to the Swan Hunter group for £2.5 million, retaining a small shareholding in Swan Hunter.

The company diversified again in 1971, buying William Hill, a chain of bookmakers. They fully acquired Mappin & Webb in 1973. They later acquired 20% of Asprey & Co.

=== Housebuilding and retirement of Clore ===
In January 1975, the group was made up of the following divisions: Footwear retailers and manufacturers (British Shoe Corporation, now also including Curtess); Departmental stores (Selfridges, Miss Selfridge, Lewis's and Robinson & Cleaver); Engineering; Motor vehicle sales and service (SMT Sales and Service, Ritchies, Shaw & Kilburn, Gilbert Rice); Jewellery retailers (Mappin & Webb, Garrard & Co, Arthur Conley & Son) and miscellaneous (Liverpool bakers S Reece & Sons); Licensed betting offices (William Hill); Linen hire and industrial laundries (Sears Industries) and knitwear manufacture (Highlander). The group also had a 20-30% interest in the Freemans mail order business and a 6% interest in Swan Hunter. They also acquired at the year end housebuilder Galliford Estates.

Clore retired as chairman in 1976 and was replaced by solicitor Leonard Sainer.

=== Sports and Leisure ===
In 1980, they acquired clothing retailer Wallis and US-based Butler Shoe Corporation in 1981. They sold Sears Industries in January 1982. In 1982, jewelers Conley were renamed Walker & Hall and in 1983, Sears acquired a 20% interest in Central Independent Television.

=== Men's retail ===
By 1985, Sears was Britain's largest shoe retailer. Foster Brothers Clothing, which owned Adams Childrenswear and Millets, were acquired in 1985. The same year the company was renamed Sears plc when it had the following brands: Fosters; Wallis; Selfridges; William Hill; Olympus Sports; Saxone; Garrard; Roland Cartier; Mappin & Webb; SMT; Adams; Shaw & Kilburn; Freeman Hardy Willis; Dolcis; Gilbert Rice; Miss Erika; Miss Selfridge; Butler; Galliford; Trueform; Lilley & Skinner; Manfield; Lewis's; Curtess; and Millets.

In April 1986, it supported a management buyout of Mallett Antiques, investing £6 million for a 50% stake but reducing it to 26% by the listing of the company in March 1987.

In July 1987, menswear retailer Horne Brothers was acquired for £34 million.

=== Freemans catalogue ===
In 1988 Freemans was fully acquired by Sears for £480 million, turning it into one of the country's largest retail organisations. It also meant that Freemans could now easily source and stock popular high street brands and promote them in its catalogue.

=== Disinvestments ===
In 1986 and 1987, the group restructured and closed or disposed the remaining engineering businesses and sold off the motor group to Lex Services for £86 million. It also sold the investment in Central Independent Television in 1986.

The Lewis's department store business and the Butler group were sold in 1988, although the company retained ownership of the Lewis stores in Glasgow and Hanley. In December 1988, the group disposed of William Hill for £331 million and in 1989 the investment in Mallett Antiques was disposed. They announced in October 1989 a withdrawal from housebuilding and they also started to dispose of some of the group's property interests.

In July 1990, Sears sold Mappin & Webb and Garrard to Asprey plc in exchange for an increased stake in Asprey, giving them a 38.5% interest in the expanded group.

In May 1992, the group decided to remove themselves from menswear retail sector and sold Fosters in September 1992. In April 1993, it finally left the housebuilding sector with the sale of Galliford.

It acquired Richard Shops in October 1992.

In August 1995, it sold Freeman Hardy Willis, Manfield and True Form to entrepreneur Stephen Hinchliffe and his business Facia, and in October 1995, sold Olympus Sports.

By 1996, the group had the following divisions: Footwear (Shoe Express, Shoe City, Saxone, Dolcis, Curtess, Roland Cartier, Cable & Co, Hush Puppies, Lilley & Skinner); Home Shopping (Freemans); Selfridges; Sears Clothing (Richards, Wallis, Warehouse, Miss Selfridge, Adams Childrenswear, The Outfit); Sears Group Properties (including The Selfridges Hotel, Part ownership of The St. Enoch Shopping Centre in Glasgow, 3,000 retail shops being mostly leasehold with a few freehold jewels such as 190 Oxford Street and 330 Oxford Street known as the Top Shop flagship store.); SearsCard and Sears Retail Services.

=== Break up of the British Shoe Corporation ===
In February 1996 the group also sold Saxone and Curtess to Facia. Soon after, the Facia group collapsed, and Sears took back the leases for 380 stores that they had sold. In August 1996, the Hush Puppies retail business was sold to Stylo plc and the wholesale business to Wolverine World Wide. The remaining parts of British Shoe Corporation were sold by early 1998, at an accounting loss of £150 million. In 1997, the shoes concession business was sold to Nine West for £9 million; Dolcis was sold to the Alexon Group; Shoe Express was sold to a consortium headed by Philip Green; Shoe City to Belgium group Brantano; and finally Cable & Co to Nine West.

Millets was sold in March 1996, ending the Sports & Leisure division and Selfridges was demerged in July 1998.

=== Acquisition by Philip Green ===
Sears plc was acquired by January Investments on behalf of Green in January 1999 for £548 million. The company delisted from the London Stock Exchange in March 1999 and re-registered as a private company (Sears Limited) on 12 April 1999. Following the sale, Freemans plc and Creation Financial Services (formerly SearsCard) were sold off, leaving the group with Sears Clothing and Sears Properties.

The womenswear business (comprising Warehouse, Richards, Wallis, Outfit and Miss Selfridge) was subsequently transferred to Arcadia Group for £151 million. Philip Green later purchased the Arcadia Group, regaining control of Wallis and Miss Selfridge alongside Arcadia's other brands (Arcadia having closed Richards, and sold Warehouse to Rubicon Retail).

== Brands owned by Sears ==
=== Footwear retailers and manufacturers ===
- True Form (1891-1995)
- Freeman Hardy Willis (1929-1995)
- Curtess (1954-1996)
- Manfield (1956-1995)
- Dolcis (1956-1997)
- Saxone (1962-1996)
- Lilley & Skinner (1962-?)
- Bertie
- Butler Shoe Corporation (1981-1988)
- Shoe City (198?-1997)
- Shoe Express (1987-1997)
- Roland Cartier
- Shoe Connection (1995-1997)
- Cable & Co (1988-1998)
- Hush Puppies (-1996)

=== Departmental stores ===
- Robinson & Cleaver (1956-
- Lewis's (1965-1988)
- Selfridges (1965-1998)
- Miss Selfridge (1966-1999)

=== Clothing ===
- Wallis (1980-1999)
- Miss Erika
- Foster Brothers Clothing (1985-1992)
- Your Price
- Adams Childrenswear (1985-?)
- Outfit (-1999)
- Warehouse (-1999)
- Horne Brothers (1987-?)
- Richards (1992-1999)

=== Sports and Leisure ===
- Olympus Sports (1978-1995)
- Millets (1985-1996)

=== Engineering ===
- Furness Shipbuilding Company (1954-1968)
- Bentley Engineering (1954-?)

=== Motor vehicle sales and service ===
- SMT Sales and Service (1959-1987)
- Ritchies (-1987)
- Shaw & Kilburn (-1987)
- Gilbert Rice (-1987)

=== Jewellery retailers and miscellaneous ===
- Mappin & Webb (1959-1990)
- Garrard & Co (1959-1990)
- Arthur Conley & Son (later renamed Walker and Hall)
- S Reece & Sons

=== Licensed betting offices ===
- William Hill (1971-1988)

=== Linen hire and industrial laundries and knitwear manufacture ===
- Consolidated Industries (renamed Sears Industries) (1964-1982)
- Highlander

=== Housebuilding ===
- Galliford (1975-1993)

=== Home shopping ===
- Freemans (1988-1999)

=== Other ===
- SearsCard (1973-1999)

== Brands after demise of Sears ==
Adams Childrenswear - trading as 'Adams Kids' - remained on the high street until 2010, after some difficulties over the years, and collapsed into administration twice in the late 2000s; former Stead & Simpson chairman John Shannon purchased a portion of the chain's outlets and the Adams brand, before the company fell into administration for a third time in 2010. The brand survives as an online business.
