= Herbert Wakefield Banks Skinner =

British physicist (1900–1960)

Herbert W. B. Skinner FRS
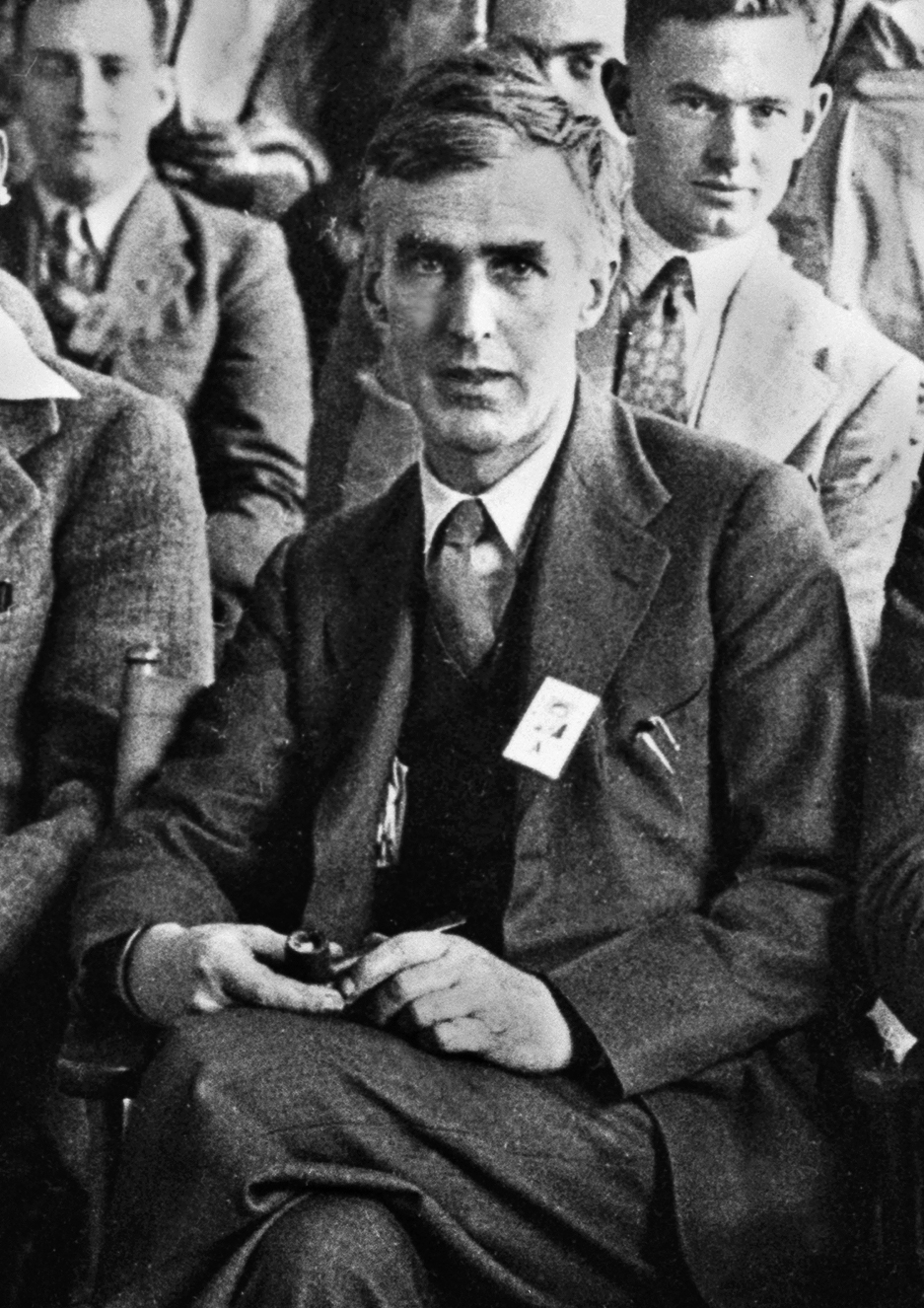
- Skinner in 1944
- Born: Herbert Wakefield Banks Skinner; 7 October 1900; Ealing, London, England
- Died: 20 January 1960 (aged 59); Geneva, Switzerland
- Resting place: Alperton Cemetery, Wembley
- Education: Durston House; Rugby School
- Alma mater: Trinity College, Cambridge
- Spouse: Erna Abrahamsohn (or Wurmbrand) (m. 1931)
- Children: Elaine Auriol
- Scientific career
- Workplaces: Cavendish Laboratory; Bawdsey Research Station; TRE; Berkeley Radiation Laboratory; AERE; University of Liverpool

Herbert Wakefield Banks Skinner FRS (7 October 1900 – 20 January 1960) was a British physicist. During the Second World War he worked on radar at the Telecommunications Research Establishment and on the Manhattan Project at the Berkeley Radiation Laboratory.

== Biography ==
Skinner was born on 7 October 1900 at 15 Woodville Road, Ealing, London, the only son of George Herbert, director of the shoe firm Lilley & Skinner, and Mabel Elizabeth (née Knight). He was taught at home before starting school at age 9 at Durston House, from where he won a mathematical scholarship to Rugby in 1914. He entered Trinity College, Cambridge in 1919 to read natural sciences and mathematics. He graduated in 1922 with a first-class in Part II of the Natural Sciences Tripos and Part I of the Mathematical Tripos.

Skinner's research career started in the Cavendish Laboratory where, under the supervision of Charles D. Ellis, he worked on the β-ray spectrum of radium B (Lead-214) and its daughter product radium C (Bismith-214). Five years later, in 1927, he moved to the physics department of the University of Bristol, which was headed by Arthur M Tyndall and very well equipped. He investigated the excitation potentials of lithium and beryllium, and published the results several years later. This research "prepared the way for his outstanding work on the soft X-ray emission spectra of light metals" in the period 1932-1940.

During the war years, Skinner was involved in radar and related techniques. Like other scientists, e.g. R A Smith, he joined the staff of Bawdsey Research Station (BRS) on the Suffolk coast, to work on the Chain Home (CH) network of early warning radar stations. With the equipment they developed they could detect surface submarines several miles away. He then went to the Telecommunications Research Establishment at Swanage, where he worked on a microwave crystal mixer and the detection of submarines.

In March 1942 he was elected a Fellow of the Royal Society. His candidature citation read:

Wills Research Fellow and Lecturer in Spectroscopy. Associated with Ellis in early work on beta-ray spectra (1924) and with Kapitza on Zeeman effect (1925). Carried out experiments on excitation processes in gases (1926-7) and evaluated the excitation function for helium (1932). Distinguished for his work on the excitation potentials of metals and the emission and absorption of soft X-rays by solids (1932 onwards). Responsible for marked advances in the technique of soft X-ray investigations which have enabled him to show for the first time the details of the fine-structure of the emission bands and the absorption edges. His interpretation of his results has provided the only direct evidence for the existence of 'Brillouin zones' in metals and much detailed information about their properties. His work is characterized by experimental skill of high order and an acute understanding of theory.

Skinner changed tack in 1943 when he joined a group of British physicists, led by Mark Oliphant, working at the Berkeley Radiation Laboratory under the direction of Ernest Lawrence to work on the electromagnetic separation of the uranium isotopes.

In 1946, the Atomic Energy Research Establishment (AERE) was set up at RAF Harwell, with J D Cockcroft as its first director, although he did not return from Canada until later that year. In Cockcroft's absence, Skinner acted on his behalf, and was heavily involved in recruiting staff and building a research laboratory. The construction of a large cyclotron, a 6 MeV Van de Graaff generator, and the 100 kilowatt GLEEP reactor were all started, but Skinner's most notable contribution was the creation of the General Physics Division.

In 1949 he moved to the University of Liverpool to take up the Chair of Physics. He worked on completing the large cyclotron, started by his predecessor James Chadwick. In later years he took a leading role in the development of CERN.

=== Family ===
Herbert Skinner married Erna Wurmbrand in 1931. They had one daughter, Elaine Auriol, who married Timothy F. Wheatley in 1960. She died in Cambridge on 14 January 2012.

When MI5 files on the spy Klaus Fuchs were released by The National Archives in May 2013, The Telegraph reported that "during his time at Harwell Fuchs spent most of his days living at the house of his best friend, Prof Herbert Skinner, the deputy head of atomic research. There, he appears to have developed a relationship with Skinner's 41-year-old Austrian-born wife, Erna", a woman described by close friend Mary Flowers as someone who "craved the attention of men and usually got it" and who "frequently drank copiously". In a recent book Professor Frank Close, particle physicist, described the close relationship between Erna and Fuchs and how, for example, they stayed at the Riviera Hotel, Maidenhead and the Palm Court Hotel in Richmond in January 1950.

Skinner died at the Hotel Bernina, Geneva on 20 January 1960, during a visit to the European Organization for Nuclear Research. He was buried at Alperton Cemetery, Wembley.
