= Harvey Jacobson =

English businessman and entrepreneur (born 1956)

- Born: 28/06/1956; Salford, North West England

Harvey Jacobson at the Jacobson Group head office, Rawtenstall

Harvey Jacobson (born 28 June 1956 in the City of Salford) is a businessman and entrepreneur based in the North West of England. He is the executive chairman of the Jacobson Group, an independent supplier of footwear in the UK, which owns brands including Gola, Lotus, Ravel, Dunlop, Lonsdale, and Frank Wright. In addition to the Jacobson Group, Jacobson also holds a range of personal business interests, from property development to international trade distribution.

== Jacobson Group ==
In 1996, Jacobson acquired Gola and the rights to Dunlop slippers. These were followed in subsequent years by brands including Lotus, Ravel, Frank Wright, Manfield, and Trueform. The group also acquired several licences, including the Lonsdale brand.

The group has premises in Rawtenstall, Oldham, Northampton and London, employing 300 staff, and supplying merchandise with a value in excess of £250 million per year.

In January 2026, it was announced Jacobson Group had been acquired by Marubeni Consumer Platform US, a subsidiary of Marubeni Corporation, for an undisclosed sum. The acquisition resulted in Jacobson Group’s portfolio of footwear brands being integrated into Marubeni’s US-based consumer platform, with the business continuing to operate under its existing management, subject to regulatory conditions.

== Other business activities ==
During the 1990s, Jacobson was an investor in North Shoe Ltd., which grew from one retail outlet to 29 in five years. Between 2002 and 2004 he was chair of the Original Factory Shop Ltd.

Jacobson owns a number of properties in the UK, South America and Europe, and is an investor in five property development schemes in the North West of England. In addition, he holds shareholdings in two trade distribution companies and two retail businesses. In 2007, Jacobson was included in the Sunday Times Rich List for the first time.
