= Adams Kids =

British children's clothing retailer

- Type: Private
- Industry: Retail clothing
- Founded: 1933 (Birmingham); 2010 (online)
- Founder: Amy Adams
- Defunct: 2010 (stores)
- Headquarters: Paddington, London, United Kingdom
- Number of locations: 260 (2008); 160 (2009); 10 (April 2010); 9 (September 2010)
- Area served: International
- Key people: Vacant (chief executive); John Shannon (owner) (2007–2008)
- Products: Clothing
- Services: Clothing retail and manufacture
- Owner: Barrowdrive Limited (trademarks)
- Number of employees: 2000 (2007?)
- Website: www.adams.co.uk

Adams Kids was a children's clothing retailer, based in Paddington, London in the United Kingdom.

== History ==
=== Early history ===
Amy Adams started a children's clothing business from her own home in Birmingham in 1933. She then opened another three stores in quick succession. Until 1973, Amy Adams and her son Michael ran the company independently, when they sold it to Foster Brothers. In 1983, Foster Brothers was itself acquired by Sears Holdings plc.

Adams had over two hundred stores by the 1980s, and by the 1990s, it had become a key player in the childrenswear market.

The company opened its first international franchise in Saudi Arabia in 1997. Further international stores were then opened in Cyprus, Greece, Republic of Ireland, Finland, Malta, India and Slovakia. In January 1999, Sears was acquired by Philip Green, who then agreed to a management buy out of Adams Childrenswear. In August 2001, it was announced that Adams planned to double in size by 2005.

=== Mini Mode brand ===
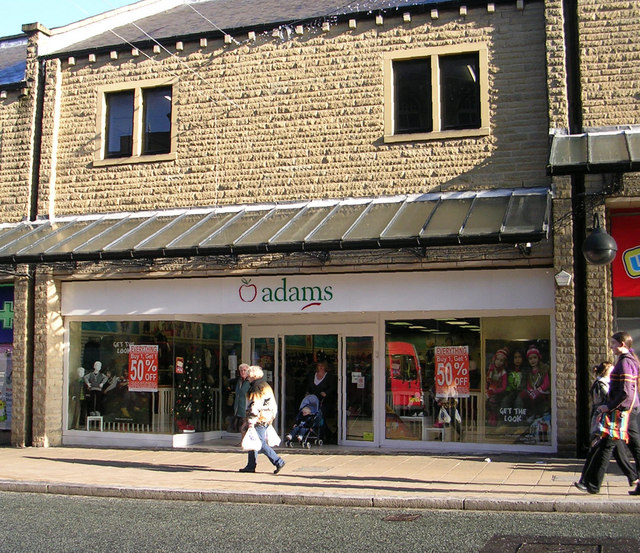
Adams store in Halifax in 2009

Adams has been making clothing under the Mini Mode brand for Boots since 2002. Mini Mode has 327 concessions, and its own online store. Mini Mode Childrenswear Limited also entered administration on 21 January 2009, with Rob Jonathan Hunt, Stuart David Maddison and Michael John Andrew Jervis being appointed as joint administrators.

=== Administration of 2006 ===
In the end of 2006, Adams went into administration, with PricewaterhouseCoopers handling the proceedings. John Shannon bought Adams out of administration in February 2007. 42 of the stores were then closed. David Carter Johnson was appointed as chief executive. In January 2008, the "kids love fashion" branding was rolled out into all stores, and store refits started in the United Kingdom and Ireland. Stores to close were:

- Kidderminster
- Merry Hill-Now occupied by Greggs

=== Administration of 2008 ===
During the weekend of 28 December 2008, Adams announced that they were again preparing to enter administration at the same time with Woolworths, MFI and Zavvi.

During the administration, there were 260 stores in the United Kingdom and 116 outlets overseas, employing around 2000 people. PricewaterhouseCoopers were approached on 24 December to act as administrators again. Adams was reported to owe around £20 million to Mr Shannon, and £10 million to Burdale.

The company entered administration on 31 December 2008. The Mini Mode brand was not affected by the administration at this time. 111 stores closed, shedding 850 jobs, but the administrators remained hopeful that Adams would still find a buyer. 160 of the stores then remained. On 26 January, a further 36 stores were closed. 125 of the stores continued to trade, while the situation was assessed.

=== 2009–2010 ===
On 15 February 2009, it was announced that former owner John Shannon, who also bought the company in 2007, would be taking it out of administration. The Adams brand would be retained. On 10 September 2009, it was announced that Adams was sold to a new an investment group under the name of Habib Alvi.

On 22 January 2010, it went into administration for the third time. On 8 February 2010, it was announced that Mini Mode would no longer exist. Mothercare designed a completely new range called 'Miniclub' sold only in Boots stores. In the beginning of 2010, Adams closed their few remaining stores and orders from the website ceased.

The defunct brand is owned by Barrowdrive Limited, a company owned by Sharad Madan, who purchased the Adams Kids trademark from Habib Alvi in April 2010.
