= Barratts Shoes =

Former brand of high street shoe shops operating in the UK and Ireland

W Barratt & Co Ltd
- Trade name: Barratts Shoes, Priceless Shoes, Dolcis, Stylo Matchmakers
- Company type: Private
- Industry: Retail
- Predecessor: W Barratt Boot and Shoe Company (1903–1964); Stylo plc (1964–2009); Barratts Priceless (2009–2012)
- Founder: William Barratt
- Headquarters: Apperley Bridge, Bradford, West Yorkshire, United Kingdom
- Products: Shoes
- Website: barratts.co.uk

Barratts was a brand of high street shoe shops operating in the UK and Ireland. The Barratts shoes brand traded from 100 UK and Ireland stores.

The company was established in Northampton in 1903, and became a highly successful brand known for its lavishly produced boot catalogues during the 1920s. In 1964, it was bought by the company Stylo and, under the Barratts brand name, expanded to over 400 stores at its height, before foreign competition in the 1990s reduced its market share.

Barratts entered administration for the third time in five years on 11 November 2013.

== History ==
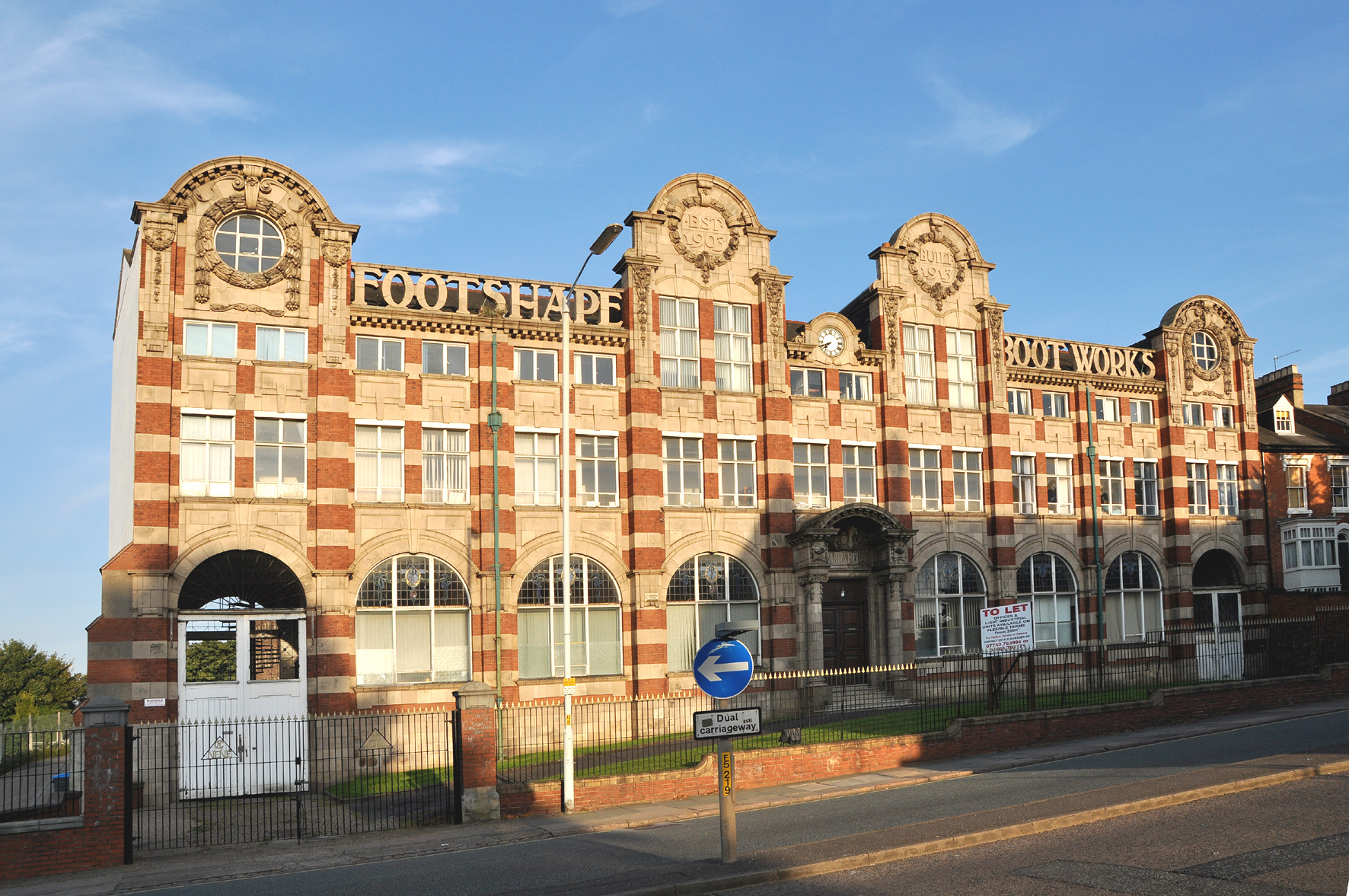
The Barratt Boot and Shoe factory in Kingsthorpe Road, Northampton. A 1911 piece of neo-baroque architecture designed by John Macvicar Anderson

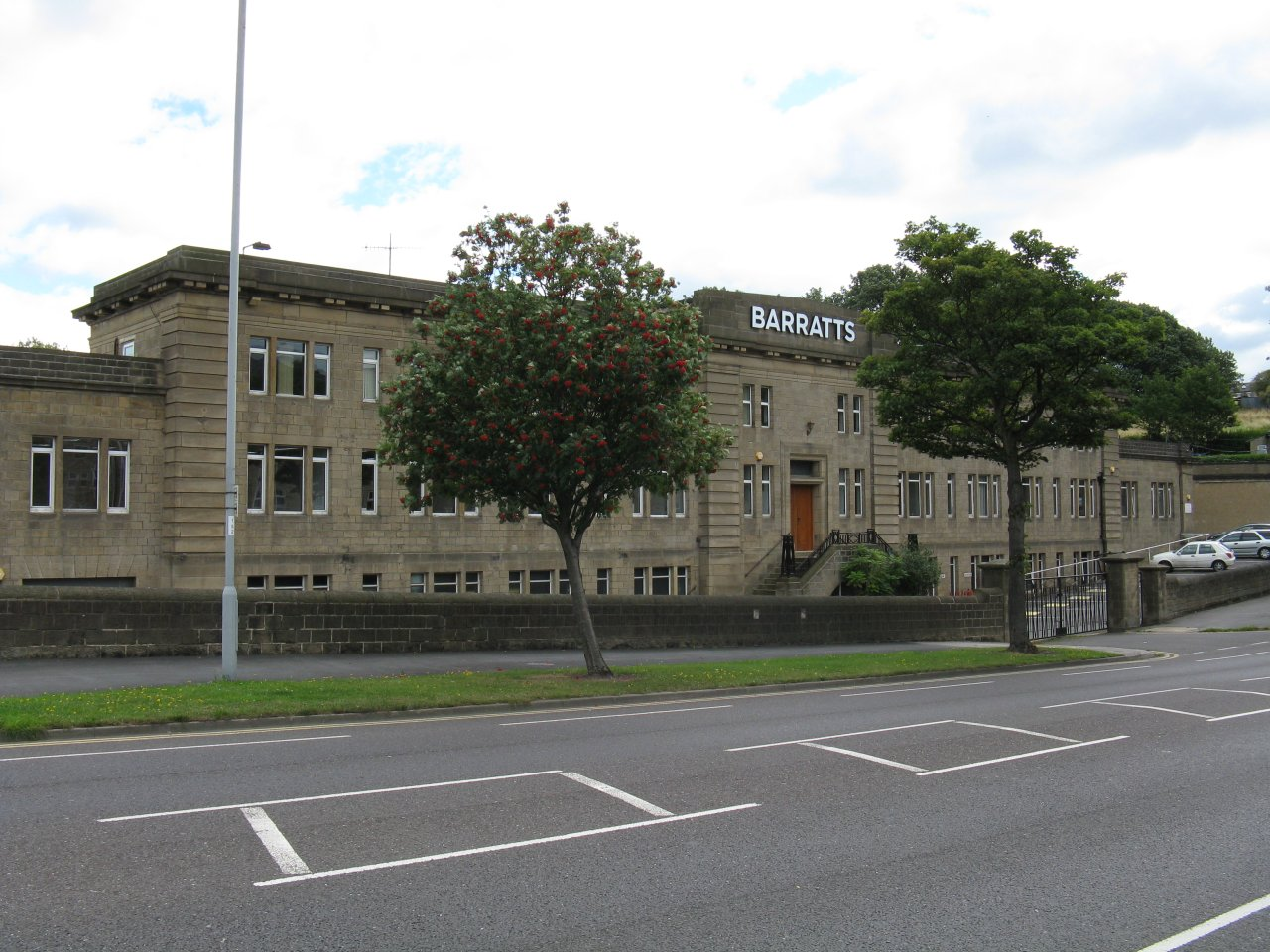
Barratts shoe warehouse in Harrogate Road, Apperley Bridge, Bradford (now a housing estate)

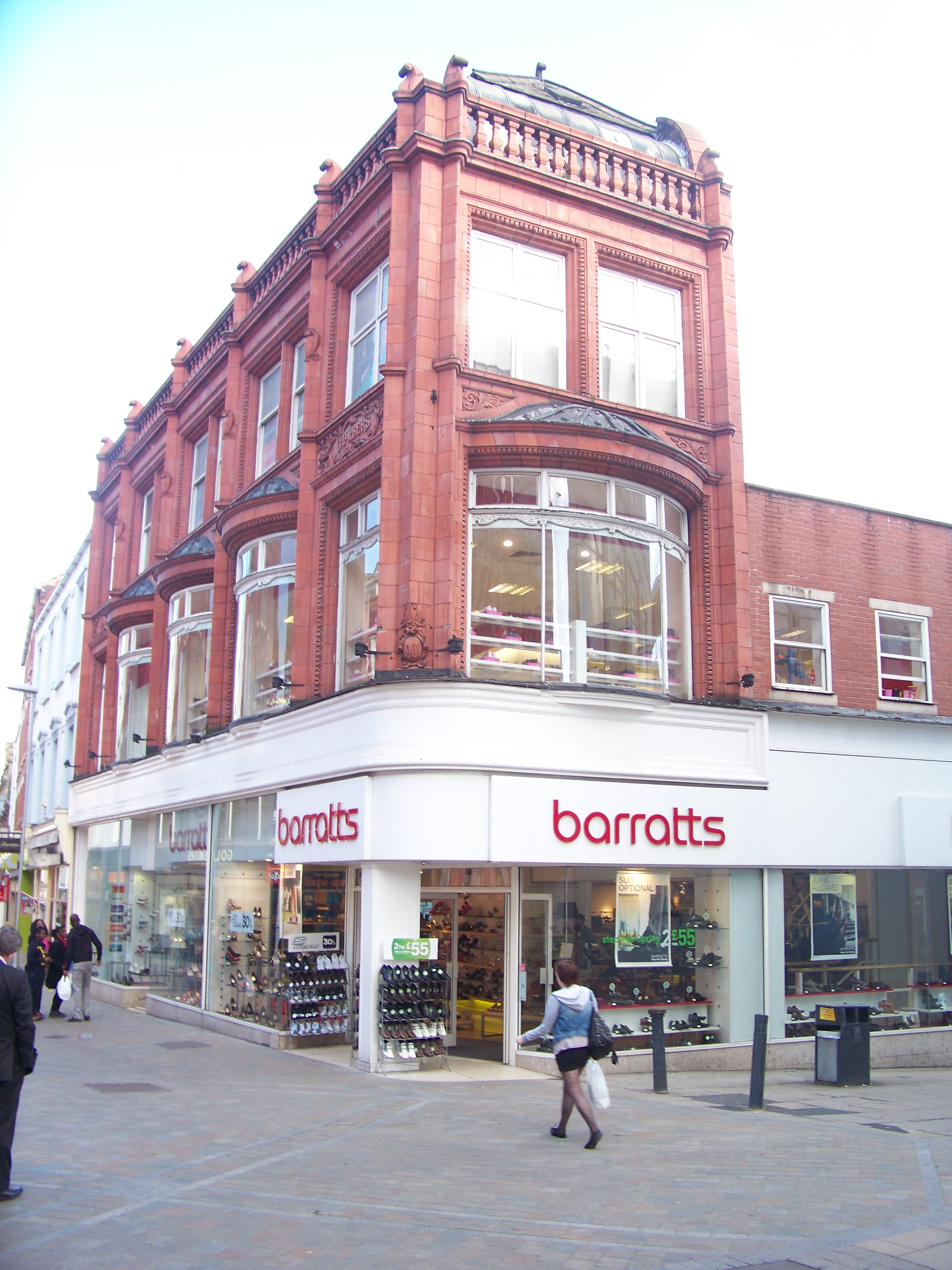
A Barratts shop, (Branch number 123), Managed by Timothy Perry, who ran the Liverpool store between, approx. 1996 and 1999 (branch 249, opened in June 1994 by Derrol Shaw (previously managed branch 50 Chester Barratts) and Darren Carter, et al. between, approx, 1994 and 1996, Commercial Street in Leeds

W Barratt Boot and Shoe Company was established in 1903 by William Barratt, and soon became one of the leading shoe manufacturers in Northampton. In 1913 it moved into a neo-Baroque factory designed by John Macvicar Anderson. The Barratts brand entered a new era of prosperity in the 1920s with the publication of luxurious promotional catalogues, including specially commissioned artwork and decorative pages. The 1923 catalogue featured an endorsement by the famed couturier Lady Duff Gordon, who also contributed an illustrated introduction to the women's section of this edition. The firm continued to flourish into the mid-20th century under the advertising slogan "Walk the Barratt Way".

Stylo was a family-run business which originated in 1935, with the consolidation of three separate companies the company was floated on the London Stock Exchange under the trade name Stylo Boot Company (Northern) Ltd. Having grown to 150 outlets, in 1964 Stylo bought W Barratt and Company, and merged the two businesses in Bradford.

Developing under the better known Barratts brand, the company expanded to over 400 retail outlets. In August 1996, Stylo bought the UK retail business for Hush Puppies from Sears plc. Also in 1996 Barratts purchased Bacons Shoes, owned by the Bacon family in the West Midlands. Bacon's shoes brand was phased out by the Managing Director, Ron Arthur Stark, from 1997 and converted the Bacons stores to Priceless. The first Priceless store conversion was in Sunderland, from a Hush Puppies store and was an instant success, selling self service shoes. The Shoe and Sport Depot brand, ran by Peter Peregrine Lee were converted to Priceless brand, originally created by Ron Arthur Stark. The Priceless brand was fully operational by 1999. Based in Apperley Bridge, Bradford, West Yorkshire, the new company operated over 300 UK and Ireland concessions across the Arcadia Group, including within Dorothy Perkins, as well as supporting the Group's online activity. Barratts also had an online presence with the retailer Wallis.

On 13 February 2008, Stylo purchased 24 stores from collapsed shoe retailer Dolcis as well as the Dolcis brand name. The shops were rebranded as Barratts.

In 2025, the Barratts brand and website were purchased and relaunched online

=== Difficulties ===
Following a trading loss of £12.5 million in 2008, on 26 January 2009, Stylo's shares were suspended. Barratts and PriceLess soon went into administration and on 13 February 2009, Stylo itself went into administration. On 19 February 2009, administrators Deloitte announced that 220 Barratt and PriceLess stores would be closing, with the loss of approximately 2,500 jobs.

The remaining 160 stores and 165 concessions, plus the Barratts and Priceless brands, were sold to a management team led by Michael Ziff, under Barratts Priceless Ltd (BPL). In December 2011, BPL called in administrators Deloitte, who immediately closed 100 stores and 359 concessions, resulting in 2,500 job losses. In January 2012, a management team led by CEO Ziff bought 89 Barratts and Priceless stores through a new company, Barratts Trading Ltd. This sold through both its own stores and e-commerce website, plus online retailers Amazon.com, Debenhams and eBay.

In 2013, just before administration, Barratts closed its Jersey store, which was later occupied by Paperchase.

In October 2013, it was reported that the business was suffering a cash flow crisis as it struggled to purchase new stock in the run-up to Christmas. On 11 November 2013, it was confirmed the company had entered administration, with 18 immediate store closures.

The retailer Pavers Shoes purchased 14 Barratts stores in December 2013. In January 2014, the Barratts brand and website were purchased by the footwear entrepreneur Harvey Jacobsen and the former buying and merchandising director of Barratts, Simon Robson.

== Stylo Matchmakers ==
In 1966 the Stylo Matchmakers sports brand was created by Paul Ziff, the son of Stylo's founder, Max, and younger brother of Arnold Ziff, with the help of IMG founder Mark McCormack.

With a wider span throughout the late 1960s and 1970s, the Stylo Matchmakers brand was more commonly worn in football, including by Pelé, and Northern Irish striker George Best.

In May 2017 the Stylo Matchmakers brand was registered globally and returned by British entrepreneur and sports agent Scott Michaels.
