= Shoe Zone =

Footwear retailer in the United Kingdom and Ireland

Shoe Zone plc
- Formerly: Bensonshoe
- Type: Public limited company
- Traded as: AIM: SHOE
- ISIN: GB00BLTVCF91
- Industry: Footwear
- Founded: 21 July 1917; 109 years ago in Leicester, UK
- Founders: Michael Smith; Christopher Smith
- Headquarters: Leicester, England, UK
- Number of locations: 271 (2025)
- Areas served: United Kingdom
- Key people: Charles Smith; (Chairman); Anthony Smith; (Chief executive officer); Terry Boot; (Finance director)
- Revenue: ▲161.3m (2024)
- Net income: ▲10.1m (2024)
- Owners: Anthony Smith (32.27%); Charles Smith (25.80%)
- Number of employees: 2,200 (2025)
- Website: www.shoezone.com

Shoe Zone (stylised as shoezone) is a footwear retailer in the United Kingdom. It has over 270 stores in different cities and towns throughout the UK and over 2,200 employees. The company has an annual turnover of £161 million. The company's headquarters are located in Leicester.

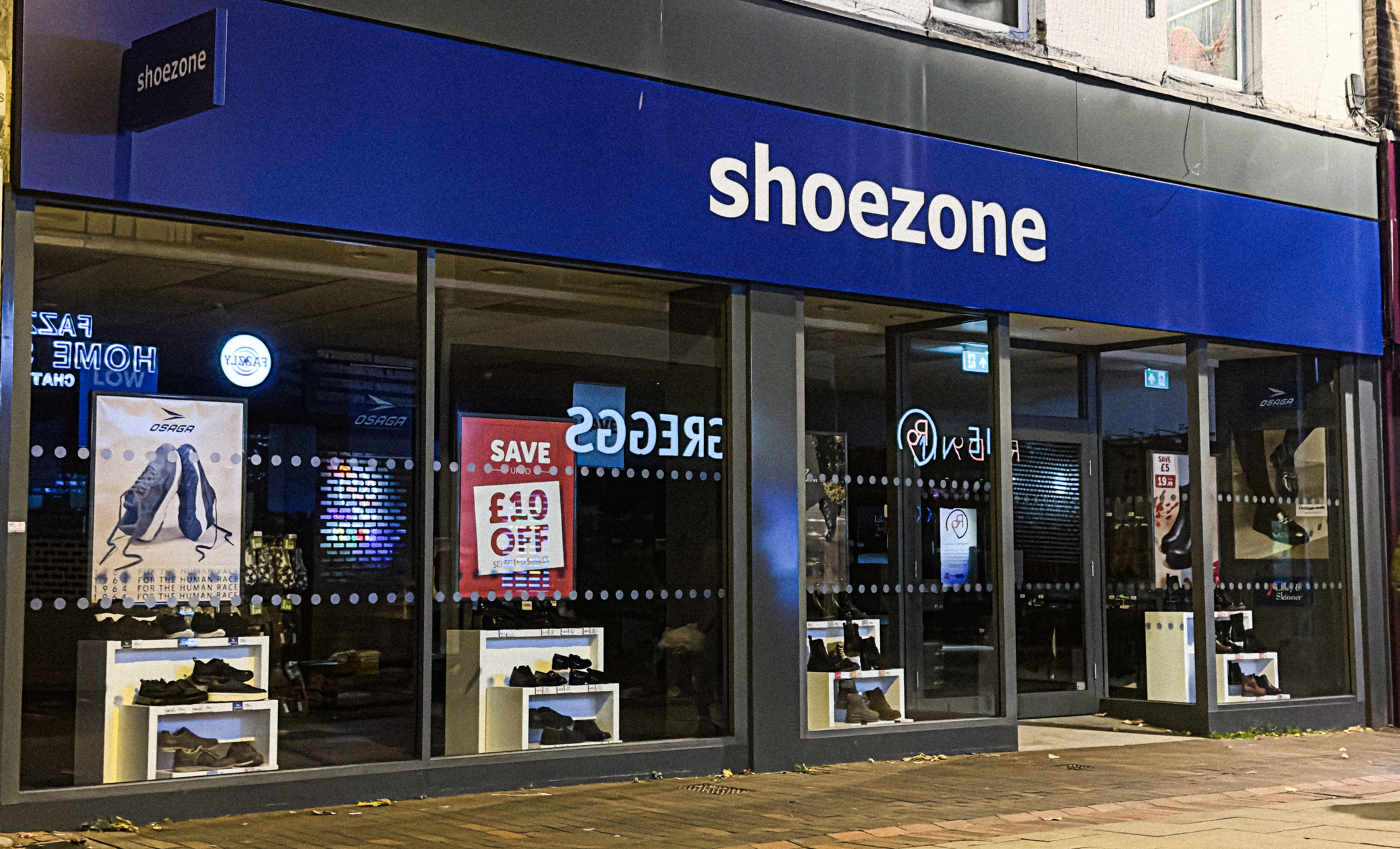
A store in Chatham, Kent, England

== History ==
The company was founded in the UK in 1917. Brothers Michael and Christopher Smith bought controlling shares in the footwear company, Bensonshoe, in 1980 (which was founded by their grandfather.) By 2000, the company had 184 stores and late that year acquired The Oliver Group plc which added a further 258 stores to its portfolio.

In September 2007, Shoe Zone acquired the shoe retailer Shoefayre for an undisclosed sum from its parent, The Co-operative Group, adding 300 stores to Shoe Zone's portfolio. In January 2009, it bought Leicester-based Stead & Simpson and converted many stores to the Shoe Zone brand.

In 2021, the company made headlines when Peter Foot stepped down as finance director and was replaced by Terry Boot, a humorous double example of aptronyms.

The company suffered from the COVID-19 pandemic and related lockdowns which resulted in declining revenue. In 2020, Shoe Zone raised debt for the first time in 15 years with a £15M CLBILS facility from NatWest.

In 2021, Shoe Zone returned a profit of £9.5M and the company announced it was debt free in January 2022.

== Operations ==
The company sells approximately 16 million pairs of footwear per year. Shoe Zone also has a charity known as the Shoe Zone Trust which raises money for children's charities. Funds raised by the company have totalled over £2.3 million as of May 2022.
