= Mahmud Kamani =

British businessman

- Born: Mahmud Abdullah Kamani; August 1964 (age 62)
- Occupation: Businessman
- Known for: Chairman, Boohoo Group plc
- Children: 3, including Umar Kamani and Adam Kamani

Mahmud Abdullah Kamani (born August 1964) is a British businessman. He is co-founder and executive chairman of Boohoo Group.

== Early life ==
His father Abdullah Kamani is from Gujarat, India; settled in Kenya, but left in the 1960s due to unrest and moved to north-west England with his wife and three children. Abdullah started by selling handbags at a market stall, before starting a family textile business, supplying New Look and Primark.

== Career ==
In 2006, Kamani co-founded the online fashion retailer Boohoo with Carol Kane. In 2013, he was awarded ‘Entrepreneur of the Year’ at the English Asian Business Awards. In 2015 he was honoured at the Legends of Industry Awards.

In April 2017, Boohoo announced that its profits had almost doubled to £31 million on sales up by 51% to almost £300 million. When the company was floated on the stock market in 2014, it was valued at £560 million, and was worth about £3.54 billion as of July 2021. In June 2017, Kamani sold a total of 36.6 million shares together with his siblings, Nurez and Rabia. He sold over £80 million worth of Boohoo shares and raised an additional £50 million by placing 22.7 million new shares. The funds raised were earmarked for the development of a “supersite” warehouse.

In April 2018, Boohoo shares recovered after brand PrettyLittleThing doubled sales. Boohoo owns 66% of the brand.

In February 2021, Boohoo bought Arcadia brands Dorothy Perkins, Wallis and Burton out of administration for £25.2 million, acquiring the brands' e-commerce and digital assets and associated intellectual property rights. That same year, the company also acquired the Debenhams brand for around £55 million.

As of September 2024, his net worth is estimated at £67 million. At the peak of his wealth, driven by the rising value of his Boohoo shareholding and other business interests, the estimated net worth of Kamani and his family exceeded £1 billion (US$1 billion).

== Personal life ==
Mahmud Kamani and his wife Aisha have three sons. Two of them, Umar Kamani and Adam Kamani, who co-founded PrettyLittleThing, are active in the family business. He lives in Mottram St Andrew, Cheshire.

His brother Jalal Kamani is the former trading director of Boohoo.

Mahmud Kamani retains his connection to Kenya by supporting Kibera Kids, a Nairobi-based non-profit organization.

In July 2020, allegations were made about the I Saw It First fashion brand and Morefray Ltd, a supply company to Boohoo, of paying less than the minimum wage and failing to protect staff from coronavirus during the pandemic. The company is owned by Jalal Kamani, who jointly founded Boohoo with his brother Mahmud.
