= Principles (retailer) =

British fashion retailer

- Company type: Private company
- Industry: Retail
- Founded: 1984
- Defunct: 2009 (standalone shops); 2021 (brand)
- Headquarters: United Kingdom
- Parent: Debenhams
- Website: debenhams.com/principles

Principles was a UK-based fashion clothing retailer founded in 1984 that went into administration in 2009. Following this the brand continued to be used by British retailer Debenhams.

== History ==
=== Foundation and early years ===
The firm was launched by the Burton Group (later the Arcadia Group) as an attempt to capitalise on the new modern trends in fashion; the mid-1980s was the boom era for the yuppie, a new upmarket cultural movement, and power dressing was a key trend: at the time, the Group's ladies' fashion operations (chiefly Dorothy Perkins) were more mainstream and traditional. Principles was the first newly launched chain from the firm since Topman in 1978, with the majority of the company's growth over the years having come from acquisitions.

In 1985 a sister brand aimed at upmarket male shoppers, Principles For Men, was launched; this chain was phased out in the late 1990s/early 2000s as part of a scaling-back of the group's less successful operations. The stores either became main Principles stores, converted to other Arcadia brands, or closed.

=== Administration and closure ===
Mosaic Fashions collapsed in 2009, and a new venture - Aurora Fashions - was created to take on the bulk of Mosaic's brands. However, Principles was not included in the deal and remained in administration. The administrators closed 66 stores due to the initial lack of a suitable buyer before Debenhams, which already hosted a number of Principles concessions in its department stores, subsequently announced that it would acquire Principles brand and most of the stock. At the time of the Debenhams deal, it was widely speculated that Principles' remaining standalone stores would close as a result of the sale; however, some did remain open, including stores in locations where there is not a main Debenhams store (such as Bluewater). In all, 66 of the chain's stores were initially closed, with others remaining; however, some of the surviving stores were subsequently closed down.

Debenhams and Principles had previously been part of same company from 1985, a year after Principles launched, when Burton Group owned the Debenhams chain, and it was during this period of common ownership that many of the Principles concessions within Debenhams were established. In 1998, Debenhams was demerged from the rest of the group and began trading independently, although the Principles concessions remained in place.

=== Relaunch ===
In February 2010, Debenhams relaunched the Principles brand as 'Principles by Ben de Lisi', with fashion designer Ben de Lisi giving his name to the brand, joining numerous other designers as part of the company's key 'Designers at Debenhams' range.
