= Miss Selfridge =

British fashion brand

- Type: Subsidiary
- Founded: 1966
- Defunct: 2021
- Fate: Converted into an online store
- Owner: ASOS
- Website: www.asos.com/miss-selfridge/

Miss Selfridge is a British fashion brand and former high street store chain which began as the young fashion section of Selfridges department store in London in 1966. It was part of the Arcadia Group, controlled by Sir Philip Green, which went into administration in late 2020. The Miss Selfridge brand was purchased by ASOS on 1 February 2021 and now operates exclusively online.

== History ==
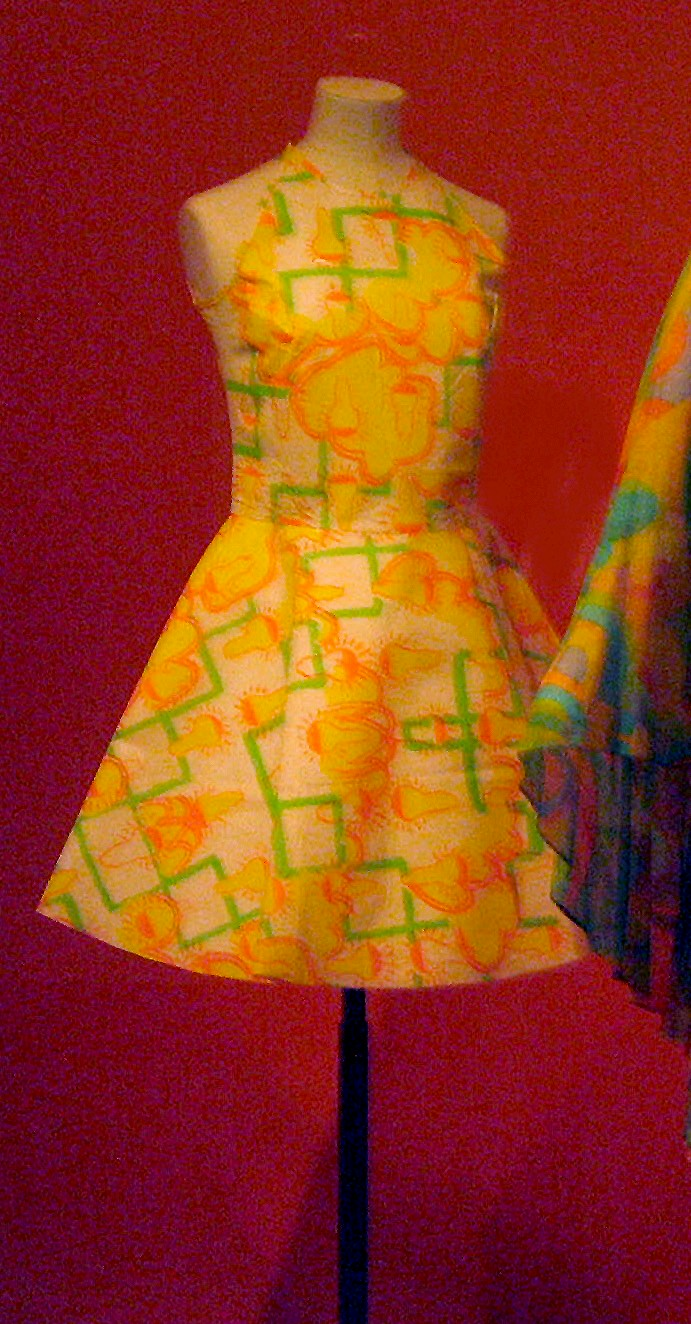
Paper dress by Sylvia Ayton and Zandra Rhodes (1966)

Miss Selfridge got its name when Charles Clore, the owner of Selfridges at the time, saw a window display in the Bonwit Teller store in New York City which showed "Miss Bonwit" dresses aimed specifically at teenagers. He later launched it throughout his Lewis's and Selfridges stores throughout the UK. By 1967 Miss Selfridge had concessions throughout the country within department stores, and by 1969 there were some independent branches on the high street.

The first of Miss Selfridge's mannequins were based on 1960s icon and model Twiggy, and the first dresses were paper dresses designed to be worn once and then thrown away, by Sylvia Ayton and Zandra Rhodes. Couturier Pierre Cardin was also commissioned by Miss Selfridge to design four exclusive collections a year.

=== Change of ownership ===
In July 1999, Arcadia Group acquired Miss Selfridge, along with Wallis and clothing retailer Outfit, from Sears plc. In 2002 Philip Green took over the Arcadia group. Miss Selfridge began their online shop in 2003. Іn the following years, the profitability of Miss Selfridge was inconsistent for Arcadia.

=== Administration ===
Arcadia Group went into administration at 8pm GMT on 30 November 2020. On 25 January 2021, ASOS said it was in "exclusive" talks to buy Arcadia's Topshop, Topman, Miss Selfridge and HIIT brands out of administration, though it only wanted the brands, not the shops. A consortium including Next had earlier dropped a bid to buy Topshop and Topman; interest in Arcadia operations had also been expressed by Mike Ashley's Frasers Group, a consortium including online retailer Boohoo.

On 1 February 2021, ASOS announced it had acquired the Topshop, Topman, Miss Selfridge and HIIT brands out of administration for £265 million, paying an additional £65 million for current and pre-ordered stock. ASOS kept 300 employees but decided to close all 70 stores as part of the deal. Miss Selfridge has since been relaunched on the ASOS website.

== Advertising and promotion ==
The first Miss Selfridge's mannequins were inspired by sixties icon and model Twiggy, and the first dresses were paper dresses, they were worn once and then thrown away, by Sylvia Ayton and Zandra Rhodes. Couturier Pierre Cardin was commissioned by Miss Selfridge to design four exclusive collections.

Miss Selfridge was one of the first retailers to use Kate Moss in their campaigns and has used other models and actresses such as Naomi Campbell, Yasmin le Bon, Tess Daly, Saffron Burrows and Nicollette Sheridan before they found major success.

In 2005, Miss Selfridge collaborated with Bella Freud to create a capsule collection. The key inspiration for this collection was drawn from Freud's trademark menswear tailoring with a touch of quirky elegance.

In 2006, to celebrate its 40th year of business, Miss Selfridge relaunched limited edition make up palettes containing some of the most successful products from the "Kiss and Make Up" make up range, which is now discontinued.

Miss Selfridge sponsored the Victoria and Albert Museum's 1960s fashion exhibition from 2006 to 25 February 2007.

In April 2010, Miss Selfridge launched the Gossip Girl Collection in which they had worked with Eric Daman, the stylist of the show Gossip Girl, to create a line of 8 dresses based on the four main female characters.

== Stores ==
In 2001, Miss Selfridge opened a new flagship store in London neighbouring Topshop's Oxford Circus megastore (located in the former flagship store of the Peter Robinson department store chain, which was also the original location which sold Topshop-branded clothing in London). In 2019, this location was closed, with Miss Selfridge relocated into the main Topshop store, and the space rented to Vans as a London flagship store.
