= Carol Kane (businesswoman) =

British businesswoman

- Born: October 1966 (age 59)
- Occupation: businesswoman
- Known for: Co-founder and joint CEO, Boohoo.com

Carol Kane (born October 1966) is a British businesswoman, the co-founder and joint CEO of Boohoo.com.

== Early life ==
Carol Kane was born in October 1966. She comes from a working-class background, the youngest of four children of a builder father.

== Career ==
Kane started her career as a designer, going to Berkshire College of Art & Design in Maidenhead Berkshire, before moving to London. In 1993, she took a position working as a senior designer for Pinstripe Clothing.

Boohoo was founded in 2006 by Carol Kane and Mahmud Kamani, who are joint chief executives.

Boohoo also runs boohooMAN.com, PrettyLittleThing.com and NastyGal.com and all of the brands are targeted at 16-24 year olds.

In April 2017, Boohoo announced that its profits had almost doubled to £31 million on sales up by 51% to almost £300 million. When the company was floated on the stock market in 2014, it was valued at £560 million, and was worth about £2 billion as of April 2017.

== Personal life ==
Kane has a long-term partner of 30 years and they live in Stafford with their four dogs.
