= Sali Hughes =

British journalist

Sali Hughes MBE (born 21 February 1975) is a Welsh journalist, writer and broadcaster. She is The Guardian's resident beauty columnist.

== Early life and education ==
Hughes was born on 21 February 1975 and grew up in Blackwood, Caerphilly. Her father worked in politics for the Labour Party and her mother worked for a local education authority. She has three brothers, and attended Ysgol Gyfun Cwm Rhymni, a comprehensive school. She initially worked as an assistant to make-up artist Lynne Easton for two years while looking for work experience at magazines. This included working on photo shoots with George Michael and Pet Shop Boys, and television commercials.

== Career ==
=== Journalism ===
Hughes's first job in journalism was as a staff writer for the men's lifestyle magazine Loaded in the mid-1990s. She then wrote features and opinion columns for various publications as a freelancer including Grazia, Elle, The Guardian, Glamour, Stylist, Shortlist, and Cosmopolitan. Since January 2011, she has been The Guardian's resident beauty columnist, featuring weekly in its Saturday magazine and online video tutorials. She also appears weekly on BBC Radio 5 Live. Hughes presented an edition of the BBC Radio 4 programme File on 4 in October 2020 about her experiences as a victim of abusive comments from internet trolls.

=== Writer ===
Hughes' first book, Pretty Honest was released on 25 September 2014. It was a beauty handbook and was published by the 4th Estate division of HarperCollins. Two years later she released her second book Pretty Iconic which was about influential beauty products. In 2019, Hughes' third book Our Rainbow Queen by Penguin was released. It was about the fashion trends of Elizabeth II. Her fourth book, Everything is Washable and Other Life Lessons, published by HarperCollins UK, was released in September 2022.

=== Podcasts ===
In 2019, Hughes partnered with Avon to be the host of their new podcast The Beauty Podcast. In 2022, she launched her own podcast Beyond The Bathroom with guests that included Jo Malone CBE, Sophie Ellis-Bextor and Bobbi Brown. In December 2025, Hughes announced season 3.

=== Skincare line ===
In April 2022, Hughes partnered with Revolution Beauty to launch her own skincare line. The range launched with two cleansers, an exfoliant, serum and two moisturisers.

== Personal life ==
Hughes married comedy writer Daniel Maier in October 2017. They live in Brighton with her two sons from a previous marriage. In 2018, she co-founded Beauty Banks, a charity that provides those living in poverty with basic daily hygiene essentials and personal care items.

Hughes was appointed a Member of the Order of the British Empire (MBE) in the 2026 Birthday Honours for services to the alleviation of hygiene poverty.
