= Forsey =

Forsey is a surname. Notable people with the surname include:

- Brock Forsey (born 1980), American football player
- Clayton Forsey (born 1953), politician in Newfoundland and Labrador, Canada
- Dave Forsey, British businessman, CEO of Sports Direct
- Eugene Forsey (1904–1991), served in the Canadian Senate from 1970 to 1979
- Jack Forsey (1913–1998), Canadian ice hockey player
- Keith Forsey (born 1948), English soundtrack composer, drummer, songwriter and record producer

== See also ==
- Greubel Forsey, watchmaking company specializing in very high-end complicated timepieces. It was launched in 2004 by Robert Greubel and Stephen Forsey and is based in La Chaux-de-Fonds, Switzerland.
