= Umar Kamani =

Indian fashion retailer and businessman

- Born: Umar Kamani; 21 March 1988 (age 38); Manchester, England
- Education: Manchester Metropolitan University
- Occupations: Entrepreneur; Fashion retailer, Restaurant partner
- Known for: Co-founder and CEO of PrettyLittleThing
- Spouse: Nada Kamani
- Parent: Mahmud Kamani
- Relatives: Adam Kamani (brother)

Umar Kamani (born 21 March 1988) is a British fashion retailer and businessman. At 24, Kamani and his brother Adam co-founded a fashion firm and online retail company selling clothing, accessories and other items to women mainly aged between 12 and 25, "PrettyLittleThing.com."

== Career ==
=== Boohoo.com ===
In 2006, Kamani began working in the family business as a manager at Boohoo.com. In 2014, Boohoo debuted on the Alternative Investment Market with a market value of £560 million. This float was a major contribution to the Kamani family's wealth. In September 2016, analysts began speculating that Boohoo.com would acquire PrettyLittleThing after reviewing Boohoo's financials, which showed a 40% increase in turnover to £127.3 million for the half year which ended in August 2016.

=== PrettyLittleThing.com ===
Brothers Umar and Adam Kamani co-founded PrettyLittleThing.com in January 2012. By the middle of 2013, celebrities including Miley Cyrus, Michelle Keegan, Rita Ora, Jessie J, Ryan Thomas and Nicki Minaj had been seen wearing clothing from their rapidly growing fashion retailer. 66% of the company was acquired by Boohoo for £3.3 million in December 2016. The PrettyLittleThing.com team grew from 65 to 300 employees from 2014 to the end of 2015. This increase was to accommodate the workload influx from fulfilling 20 orders a day in 2014 to shipping 20,000 parcels a day by the middle of 2015. Additionally Umar reported a 500% increase in full-year sales to £30 million. In 2016, PrettyLittleThing opened their flagship US location in Los Angeles, California. The launch party was hosted by Kylie Jenner.

In May 2020, Kamani sold his 34 per cent remaining stake in PrettyLittleThing.com to BooHoo for £330 million. The deal gave him £161 million in cash and a stake worth roughly 2.6 percent in Boohoo.

In April 2023, Kamani announced he was stepping down as Chief Executive at PrettyLittleThing.com.

== Personal life ==
Kamani married British-Saudi model Nada Adelle in May 2024.
