= Debenhams (online retailer) =

British online retailer

DBZ Marketplace Online Limited
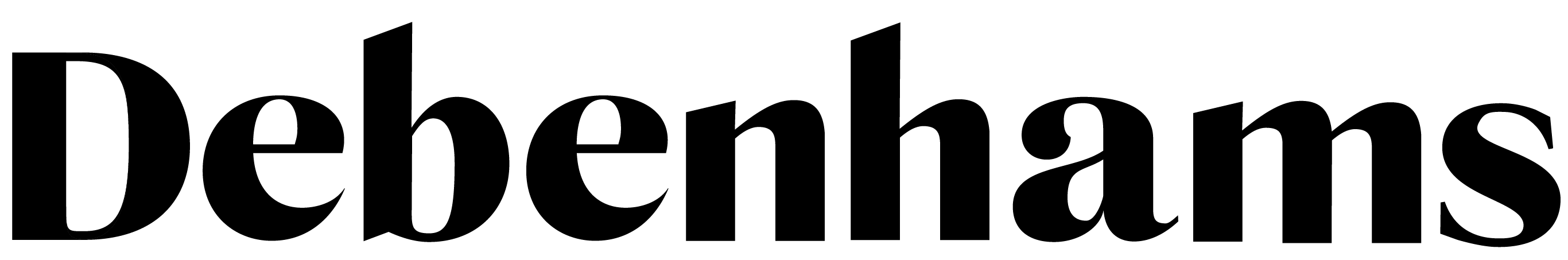
- Trade name: Debenhams
- Type: Online retailer
- Industry: Fashion online retail Beauty store
- Predecessor: Debenhams (1778–2021)
- Founded: 2021
- Headquarters: 49/51 Dale Street, Manchester, England, UK,
- Number of locations: 1 (2025)
- Area served: United Kingdom
- Key people: Daniel Finley, Chief Executive Officer; John Lyttle, Group Chief Executive
- Products: clothing; shoes; accessories; toys; beauty and fragrance; jewellery and watches; gifts; electricals; home and furniture; garden; luggage; sports and leisure
- Brands: Burton; Coast; Dorothy Perkins; Oasis; Wallis; Warehouse; Nasty Gal
- Owner: Debenhams Group
- Parent: Debenhams Holdings Limited
- Website: debenhams.com

DBZ Marketplace Online Limited, trading as Debenhams (formerly Debenhams.com), is an online retailer owned by the namesake Debenhams Group. The company was formed in 2021 after Boohoo purchased the website operations and rights to the name of the department store group Debenhams, which had entered liquidation.

== History ==
In January 2021, Boohoo Group purchased the Debenhams intellectual property and associated website operations from the administrators for £55 million. On 12 April 2021, Boohoo relaunched Debenhams.com with a new full range of products and brands, mostly brands owned by Boohoo. Debenhams' remaining stores continued to trade separately to the website operation until their closure in May that year.

Boohoo Group's acquisition of the Debenhams brand honoured a pre-existing franchise agreement with Alshaya Group, who operate Debenhams Middle East across five countries. In December 2025, Alshaya Group shuttered the six remaining stores in Bahrain, Kuwait, Qatar, and the United Arab Emirates.

Debenhams stores continue to operate in Iran, however, it is unknown if the chain operates under a licence agreement with Debenhams Group or if it has acquired the trademarks to the name in Iran.

Following Boohoo Group’s reorganisation under the Debenhams Group name, several of its fashion brands, including Nasty Gal and Dorothy Perkins, were consolidated under the Debenhams online platform.

=== Debenhams.com Beauty ===
In December 2021, Boohoo Group opened a physical Debenhams.com Beauty outlet in the Manchester Arndale shopping centre. This followed previous comments from Boohoo's Group Chief Executive John Lyttle to The Times that some beauty brands had refused to supply products to Debenhams.com unless it had a physical store presence, thus Boohoo planned to open one physical Debenhams-branded beauty store outside London to meet these requirements. The Arndale store has since closed.

In 2023 a Debenhams Beauty showroom opened in London and in 2025 intentions to open up to five Debenhams Beauty showrooms were announced.
