= Sophia Amoruso =

American businesswoman

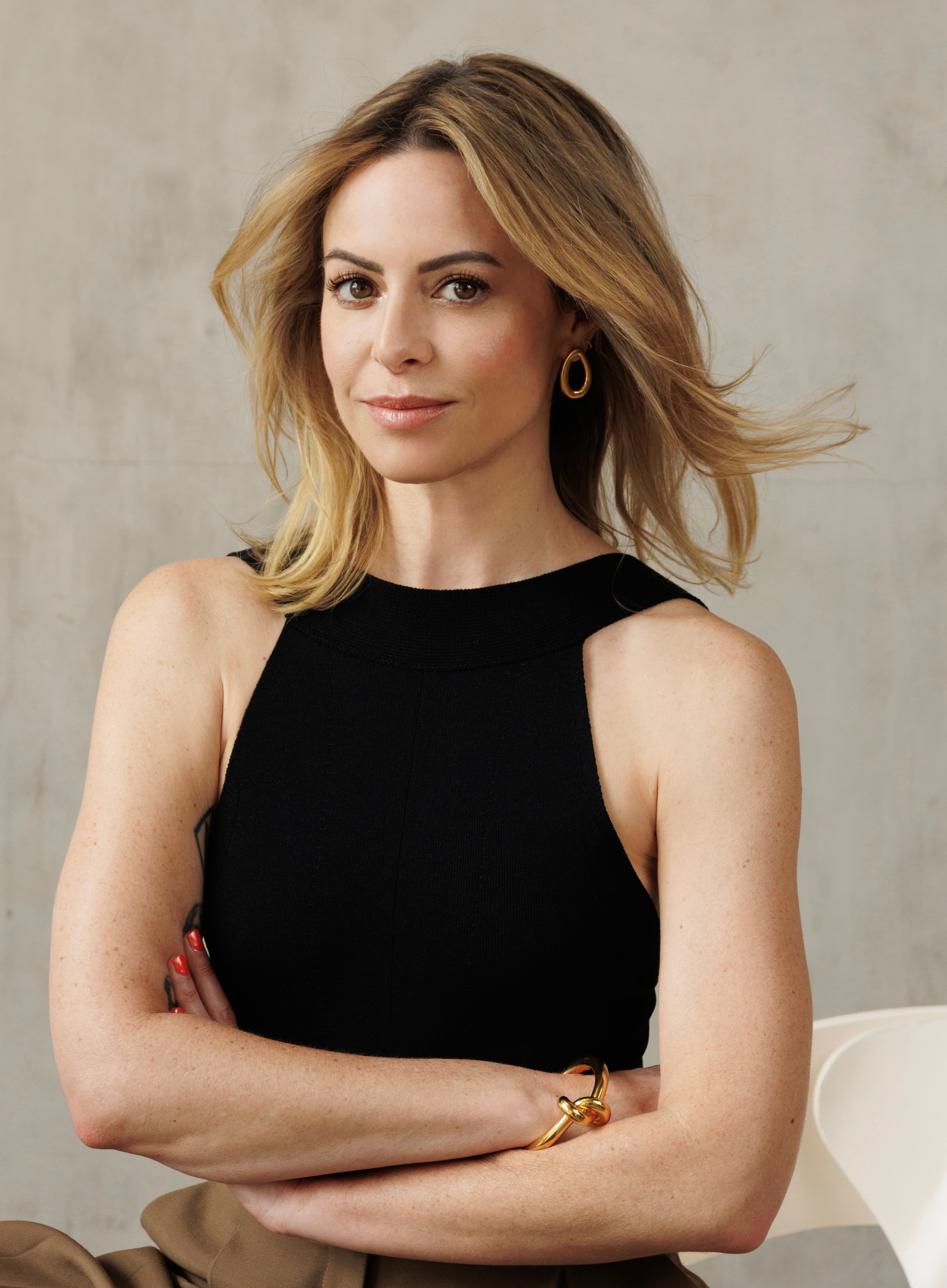
- Amoruso in 2015
- Born: Sophia Christina Amoruso; April 20, 1984 (age 42); San Diego, California, U.S.
- Occupation: Entrepreneur
- Spouse: Joel DeGraff (m. 2015; div. 2017)
- Website: sophiaamoruso.com

Sophia Christina Amoruso (born April 20, 1984) is an American businesswoman. Amoruso founded Nasty Gal, a women's fast fashion retailer, which went on to be named one of "the fastest growing companies" by Inc. Magazine in 2012. In 2016, she was named one of the richest self-made women in the world by Forbes. However, in 2016, Nasty Gal filed for bankruptcy.

In 2017, Amoruso founded Girlboss Media, a company that creates content for women in the millennial generation to progress as people in their personal and professional life.

Her 2014 autobiography #GIRLBOSS was adapted into the Netflix series Girlboss.

== Early life ==
Amoruso was born In 1984 in San Diego, California at Sharp Memorial Hospital. She grew up in the suburbs and wanted to leave home because her parents did not get along. She is of Greek, Italian, and Portuguese American descent. She was raised in the Greek Orthodox church. After being diagnosed with depression and attention deficit hyperactivity disorder (ADHD) in her adolescence, she dropped out of school and began homeschooling to help cope with these issues. Her first job as a teenager was at a Subway restaurant, followed by various odd jobs, including working in a bookstore and a record shop. After high school, her parents divorced and she moved to Sacramento, California, to live a freer lifestyle.

As a young adult, Amoruso lived a nomadic lifestyle, hitchhiking on the West Coast, dumpster diving, and stealing. In 2003, while living in Portland, Oregon, she stopped stealing after being caught shoplifting. She left Portland and relocated to San Francisco, shortly after she discovered she had a hernia in her groin. To get the health insurance for surgery, she worked in the Academy of Art University lobby checking student IDs.

== Career ==
As of 2025, Amoruso is the founder and managing partner of Trust Fund, a venture capital firm that invests in pre-seed and seed-stage startups.

=== eBay store ===
At age 22, while working as a security guard at the Academy of Art University in San Francisco, Amoruso started an eBay store called Nasty Gal Vintage. The name was inspired by a 1975 album by funk singer Betty Davis. The store sold vintage clothing and other secondhand items. The first item she sold was a book she had taken as a teenager. Amoruso handled all aspects of the business herself, including styling, photography, writing product descriptions, and shipping orders, using skills learned in a photography class.

She began the business from her bedroom, and by 2006, Nasty Gal Vintage had grown significantly. After six years, it generated about $1 million in annual revenue. In 2008, Amoruso was banned from eBay for including hyperlinks in customer feedback. She later launched Nasty Gal as a standalone online retail website. Amoruso has said she chose to leave eBay due to policies that prevented sellers from leaving negative feedback for buyers. She was also accused of artificially increasing bids, a claim she has denied.

=== Nasty Gal ===
Nasty Gal developed an online following of young women on social media. It quickly grew with revenues increasing from $223,000 in 2008 to almost $23 million in 2011. At the peak of Nasty Gal, it was pulling in $100 million in annual sales, with over 200 employees. The New York Times has called her "a Cinderella of tech". In 2013, Inc. Magazine named her to its 30 under 30 list. Also, in 2013, Business Insider named Sophia Amoruso one of the sexiest CEOs alive.

In 2014, Amoruso's autobiography #GIRLBOSS was published by Portfolio, a Penguin imprint that specializes in books about business. In 2016, it was announced that Netflix would be adapting her autobiography into a television series called Girlboss. Amoruso confirms most of the show was accurate to her life. It was cancelled after one season, as it got a sour response from viewers, saying it was a call to millennial narcissists.

In an interview with Dan Schawbel of Forbes, Amoruso admitted that she was unprepared for the demands of being a CEO, having had no previous leadership experience, and advised that people seeking to launch a business first gain managerial experience at established companies.

On January 12, 2015, Amoruso announced she was stepping down as CEO of Nasty Gal, knowing the company could not continue under the current leadership. In November 2016, the company was reported to be filing for Chapter 11 bankruptcy protection, with Amoruso resigning as executive chairwoman. The reason for this bankruptcy can be pointed to leadership changes, a "toxic work culture", and poor communication, among other faults. In February 2017, the Boohoo Group purchased Nasty Gal for $20 million, with Nasty Gal remaining in Los Angeles and continuing to produce apparel, shoes, and accessories under its own brand.

=== Girlboss Media ===
In December 2017, Amoruso founded Girlboss Media(#girlboss), a company that creates editorial content, videos, and podcasts aimed at a female audience. Since 2017, Amoruso has held Girlboss Rallies, which are weekend-long instructional events for young entrepreneurs for around $500–$1400.

== Filmography ==
Television and film roles
Year	Title	Role	Notes
2010	SkyDiver (Instructional Video #4: Preparation for Mission)	Sophia	Feature film
2012	House of Style	Herself	2 episodes
2015	Project Runway All Stars	Herself / Guest Judge	Episode: "Some Like It Hot Dog"
2015	Pop Culture Underground	Herself	Episode: "Style"
Other credits
Year	Title	Role	Notes
2017	Girlboss	Executive producer and writer	13 episodes; Based upon the book #Girlboss

== Bibliography ==
- Amoruso, Sophia (2014). Girlboss. Penguin. ISBN 9780241217931.
- Amoruso, Sophia (2016). Nasty Galaxy. Penguin. ISBN 9780241290507.

Amoruso also has a chapter giving advice in Tim Ferriss' book Tools of Titans.
