= Arcadia Group =

British multinational retailing company

Arcadia Group Ltd
- Trade name: Arcadia
- Formerly: Burton Group plc Arcadia Group plc
- Type: Private company
- Industry: Retail
- Founded: 1929; 97 years ago (as Burton Group plc); 1998; 28 years ago (as Arcadia Group plc)
- Defunct: 2021; 5 years ago
- Fate: Administration
- Headquarters: London, England
- Area served: Worldwide
- Key people: Philip Green (Chairman); Ian Grabiner (CEO); Paul Budge (Finance director); Deloitte (Administrators)
- Products: Clothing; Accessories; Shoes
- Owner: Taveta Investments
- Number of employees: 13,000 (2020); 0 (2021)
- Divisions: Arcadia Group Brands Ltd (in administration)
- Subsidiaries: Topshop (sold to ASOS); Topman (sold to ASOS); Burton (sold to Boohoo); Evans (sold to City Chic); Wallis (sold to Boohoo); Dorothy Perkins (sold to Boohoo); Miss Selfridge (sold to ASOS); Outfit (closed)
- Website: www.arcadiagroup.co.uk

Arcadia Group Ltd (formerly Arcadia Group plc and, until 1998, Burton Group plc) was a British multinational retailing company headquartered in London, England. It was best known for being the previous parent company of British Home Stores (BHS), Burton, Dorothy Perkins, Debenhams, Evans, Miss Selfridge, Topman, Topshop, Wallis and Warehouse. At its peak, the group had more than 2,500 outlets in the UK and concessions in UK department stores and several hundred franchises operated internationally.

The company was majority owned by Taveta Investments, owned by Tina Green, wife of Sir Philip Green, chairman of the Arcadia Group.

BHS, also owned by Green, was integrated into Arcadia in 2009. In 2015 the then loss-making BHS was sold for £1 to Retail Acquisitions Ltd, owned by Dominic Chappell. In 2019, on the bankruptcy of BHS, British MP Frank Field, who previously investigated the BHS pension deficit, criticised Philip Green for paying considerable dividends to his family and to friend Richard Caring "when things are going well", and making his employees pay "when things are not going well".

In April 2019, it was reported that the Arcadia Group, controlled by the Green family, had recorded a £300m deficit in its pension fund, while the Green family had cashed out £1.2bn in dividends from Arcadia in 2005.

The Arcadia Group entered administration on 30 November 2020. By 8 February 2021 all of the brands previously owned by Arcadia had been sold off by administrators to online retailers, mainly ASOS and Boohoo, sealing the fate of the remaining bricks-and-mortar sites and thousands of jobs. Outfit, a chain of out-of-town stores encompassing multiple Arcadia clothing brands, was simply closed.

== History ==
=== Early history and pre-WW2 era ===
The Arcadia Group has its origins in the firm founded by 18-year-old Lithuanian immigrant Montague Burton in Chesterfield in 1903 as The Cross-Tailoring Company. Burton's initial operation, a men's clothing manufacture, tailoring and retailing operation, became the genesis for the current Burton Menswear chain, which remains part of the company, albeit having moved away from traditional tailoring to mainstream men's off-peg casuals and formalwear line with shifting trends in fashion and clothing. The eventual holding company survived as Burton Group plc until 1998 when the current name was substituted.

The firm's headquarters moved from Chesterfield to Leeds in 1910, and The Cross-Tailoring Company had changed its name to Burton by the time the First World War broke out in 1914.

The company was first listed on the London Stock Exchange in 1929, when it had 400 stores, factories, and mills. By then, the company had a large factory in Leeds.

=== Post-war developments and expansion ===
After World War II, Montague Burton offered men the chance to buy a full suit, which included a jacket, trousers, waistcoat, shirt, and underwear, which became known as The Full Monty. In 1946, the company acquired the Peter Robinson women's fashion chain. By 1952, the year Montague Burton died, the company was the largest multiple tailor in the world. Burton was the official suit supplier of the England national football team for the World Cup in 1966.

In 1964, the Peter Robinson chain began what became a relaunch as Topshop. This was in response to the development of a new young fashion culture around Britain in the 1960s; Topshop became the company's home of young, modern, on-trend ladieswear, a role it continues to hold. The Topshop launch began with Topshop-branded departments within Peter Robinson stores in 1964, with the first standalone Topshop stores opened ten years later in 1974. The Peter Robinson name was eventually dropped altogether. In 1971 the Group acquired Evans, a major operator in the field of fashionable clothing for women wearing larger-sized clothes.

In the 1970s, and as a complement to the suit business, the Group began to develop itself significantly in mainstream clothing retailing by starting to target chains to precisely defined markets - for example, it launched Topman for young men in 1970. This development capitalised on the success of Topshop in catering to a young, fashion-savvy audience and reflected the growth in men's casual clothing, with formal-wear sales declining due to the trend for more casual general clothing.

The firm also expanded its horizons by acquiring businesses outside its fashion heartland, at one point owning Ryman, the stationery chain, but later scaled back to focus principally on clothing.

The Dorothy Perkins chain was acquired in 1979, enabling the Group to expand into the mainstream womenswear market, following the success of its previous ladieswear ventures (Topshop and Evans). The Dorothy Perkins chain has subsequently been positioned as the group's main ladieswear operation, focused towards a similar target audience as Burton is in menswear.

In 1984, the Group launched a new chain, Principles, for fashion-conscious women with a higher disposable income; this allowed the firm to capitalise on emerging new fashion and business trends of the 1980s, such as power dressing. Principles for Men was launched a year later, in 1985, following the success of the ladies' division.

Also in 1985, the Group acquired Debenhams, then the largest department store group in the UK. The large store Browns of Chester, which had previously been part of the Burton group, was subsequently moved across to trade as part of the Debenhams chain and remained part of the Debenhams unit following the unit's divestment (it was only Debenhams-owned department store to retain a unique name alongside the corporate brand at the time of its closure in 2021).

The firm also purchased menswear firm Colliers, ultimately rolling this into the Burton, Topman and Principles For Men chains.

=== 1990–2002: reorganisation, rebranding, launches and acquisitions ===
In 1993, spurred on by the recession of the early 1990s, which had led to declining sales across the retail clothing market, the Burton Group undertook a major review of its trading space portfolio. Under the banner of Townprint, the firm reviewed the location and branding of its stores in each town and city in which it operated. At the time of the review, the Group was operating in the region of 1,600 stores, some of which had been with the group for some years and some of which needed to be performing more adequately. The ultimate result was that the Group ended the leases on around 380 of the outlets they were trading from at that point, though replaced over half of these (around 220 stores in all) with the lease of store units which the Group had not previously been trading from. Around 350 stores were transferred from one of the company's brands to another. As part of the Townprint programme, the firm began to roll out new ways of working, such as operating increasing numbers of combined stores, where several brands shared the same unit; these combinations (such as Topshop/Topman or Burton/Dorothy Perkins unit-shares) would continue to be developed through the 1990s and 2000s as a way of reducing overheads while maintaining geographical spread of the brands.

In 1996, the Group made its first move into home shopping with the acquisition of Innovations, a mail-order catalogue company, along with the Hawkshead brand in July 1996 and Racing Green in October 1996. Innovations and some related brands were then sold to the home shopping group Great Universal Stores in November 1997.

The decision to de-merge Debenhams and separate it from the rest of the Group was announced in July 1997: the plan was approved by shareholders in January 1998, and the de-merger took effect later that month. At that time, Debenhams became a separate company with its listing on the London Stock Exchange. It was at this point that the Group, until then still known as Burton Group plc, became Arcadia Group plc.

The late 1990s also saw the launch of a new experimental high-fashion menswear chain, SU214 (Style Union 214), which took its name from its flagship store at 214 Oxford Street in London. The chain aimed to capitalise on the growing demand for high-end casualwear and expand upon the group's presence in the young menswear market.

In June 1998, the Group acquired Wade-Smith, the Liverpool-based retailer of designer childrenswear, menswear, and womenswear. The acquisition was primarily to allow Arcadia to expand its presence in the childrenswear market, which they had made little attempt at up to this point. New Wade Smith Jr stores opened in locations such as the Bluewater Shopping Centre in Kent.

In June 1999, the Arcadia Group launched Zoom, an e-commerce and Internet Service Provider that formed a vital part of the Group's multi-channel approach to retailing. Shortly after Zoom's launch, Associated Newspapers Ltd acquired a 50% stake in Zoom, allowing both partners to benefit from the increased joint marketing opportunities.

In July 1999, Arcadia Group increased its share of the UK womenswear market with the acquisition of the Sears womenswear businesses, comprising the Warehouse, Wallis, Richards, Miss Selfridge and Outfit brands from the defunct Sears plc. Shortly afterward, Arcadia chose to close down the underperforming Richards chain, though shops in suitable locations were rebranded under other Arcadia store brands. Arcadia continued to develop the Wallis, Miss Selfridge, and Warehouse brands, and expanded significantly the Outfit out-of-town store chain, introducing other Arcadia brands to the stores and expanding the store network.

In 2000, the firm undertook a strategy known internally as BrandMAX under which underperforming brands were closed or scaled down. In some cases stores which were closed were replaced by other Arcadia properties. As part of BrandMAX, the Wade Smith Jr, Principles For Men and SU214 store brands ceased to trade and were absorbed as concessions into other group businesses (for instance, menswear chain SU214 was absorbed into Topman). Miss Selfridge was also reduced significantly in size (though gained a new London flagship store in the former SU214 flagship site) and all remaining standalone Topman stores were replaced by combined Topshop-Topman stores, a process of integration which had begun some years previously.

=== 2002–2020: the Green era ===
In 2002, Arcadia Group plc was bought by Taveta Investments, owned by Taveta Ltd, based in Jersey. Taveta Ltd is owned by Philip Green's family, the only director being his wife, Tina Green. Accordingly, Arcadia Group became a private company and was delisted from the London Stock Exchange.

By the middle of October 2002, the company had sold some of its chains, including Principles, Warehouse, Racing Green and Hawkshead, to Rubicon Retail for £35m. Those Outfit stores which were already retailing Principles and Warehouse clothing continued to do so by arrangement with the new owners. Arcadia also entered into discussions regarding the sale of the Wade Smith brand back to its previous owners.

In 2005, Sir Philip Green bought the UK retail stores of Etam and Tammy; these stores were converted into other Arcadia retail outlets, with Tammy clothing subsequently being retailed through BHS and Outfit stores. Some of the stores not retained by Arcadia were taken up by other fashion retail groups, with Monsoon acquiring a large number of the outlets.

In February 2009, it was announced that the BHS department store chain, also owned by the Greens, would be integrated into Arcadia. As part of the changes, some administrative functions previously run separately were intended to be consolidated to improve efficiency, and some BHS retail stores were to begin to carry Arcadia brands as concessions, enabling Arcadia to expand the presence of its brands without having to lease numerous new stores, and allowing the firm to cut costs by transferring operations from stand-alone stores into BHS locations.

In late 2010, Arcadia began a further review of its property portfolio, similar to those undertaken under the Townprint and BrandMAX schemes; several hundred of the group's existing store leases were set to expire over the next three to five years. Analysts estimated that between 150 and 300 stores could be shut and replaced with new locations or integrated/combined stores. After Phillip Green confirmed that the number of stores under lease was to fall, in 2013–14, Arcadia began shutting stores in several locations, mostly small-to-medium-sized towns and cities, including South Shields, Barnsley, Scunthorpe, Dartford, Crawley, Erdington and Market Harborough. Arcadia cited the rise in online shopping and "destination" centres as a reason for moving away from high street locations. In March 2015, following continued losses, BHS was sold to Retail Acquisitions Ltd.

In March 2019, after continued losses, it was reported that Sir Philip Green was exploring a company voluntary arrangement (CVA) to restructure the company. It was feared the plan could lead to more shop closures and job losses. A month later, two restructuring specialists were added to the Arcadia Group's board to oversee the implementation of the CVA. Amid the 2020 UK outbreak of COVID-19, the group cancelled £100m of clothing orders which added to growing concerns of labour rights organisations of the impact on garment manufacturers globally.

=== Closures ===
In May 2019, Arcadia Group confirmed it planned to close multiple stores across the UK, US and Ireland with the possibility of further closures worldwide. Many stores across the UK were set to close including Topshop's flagship store on London's Oxford Street and up to five Topshop stores closing including the branch in Swindon.

Stores outside the UK, US and Ireland were expected to remain open as they were under a franchise agreement. A total of 17 stores were confirmed for closure in the UK and a further six stores in the Republic of Ireland. All eleven Topshop and Topman co-branded stores were to close across the US, with Arcadia filing for Chapter 15 bankruptcy in the United States. Their products are currently available online through Nordstrom in North America.

Between summer 2019 and winter 2020, Wallis, Evans and Dorothy Perkins (Dublin and Cork) stores exited the Irish market, Miss Selfridge stores (in Galway and Dublin) and flagship stores belonging to Topshop and Topman (Dublin) also closed. Due to the global COVID-19 pandemic, Brexit and continued issues with its parent company, Arcadia was expected to confirm a full closure of its Irish operations for late 2020 or early 2021. In December 2020, Arcadia's Irish companies (Arcadia Group Multiples Ireland Ltd, Topshop/Topman Ireland Ltd, Wallis Retail Ireland and Miss Selfridge Retail Ireland) confirmed they would be liquidated, however, they would continue to trade until early 2021. The impending closure of its Irish operations would result in less than 500 job losses in Ireland.

=== Administration ===
Arcadia Group went into administration at 8pm GMT on 30 November 2020, placing 13,000 jobs at risk. On 25 January 2021, ASOS said it was in "exclusive" talks to buy Arcadia's Topshop, Topman, Miss Selfridge and HIIT brands out of administration, though it only wanted the brands, not the shops. A consortium including Next had earlier dropped a bid to buy Topshop and Topman; interest in Arcadia operations had also been expressed by Mike Ashley's Frasers Group, a consortium including JD Sports, and online retailer Boohoo.

On 1 February 2021, ASOS announced it had acquired the Topshop, Topman and Miss Selfridge brands out of administration for £265 million, paying an additional £65 million for current and pre-ordered stock. ASOS kept 300 employees on as part of the deal but didn't keep any of the brand's 70 stores, putting 2,500 jobs at risk.

On 8 February 2021, Boohoo announced it had acquired the Burton, Dorothy Perkins and Wallis brands out of administration for £25.2 million. Boohoo took on the ecommerce and digital assets of the three brands, as well as their inventory and transfer of 260 jobs. The deal did not include the brands' combined 214 stores, concessions or franchises, putting 2,450 jobs at risk.

== Operations ==
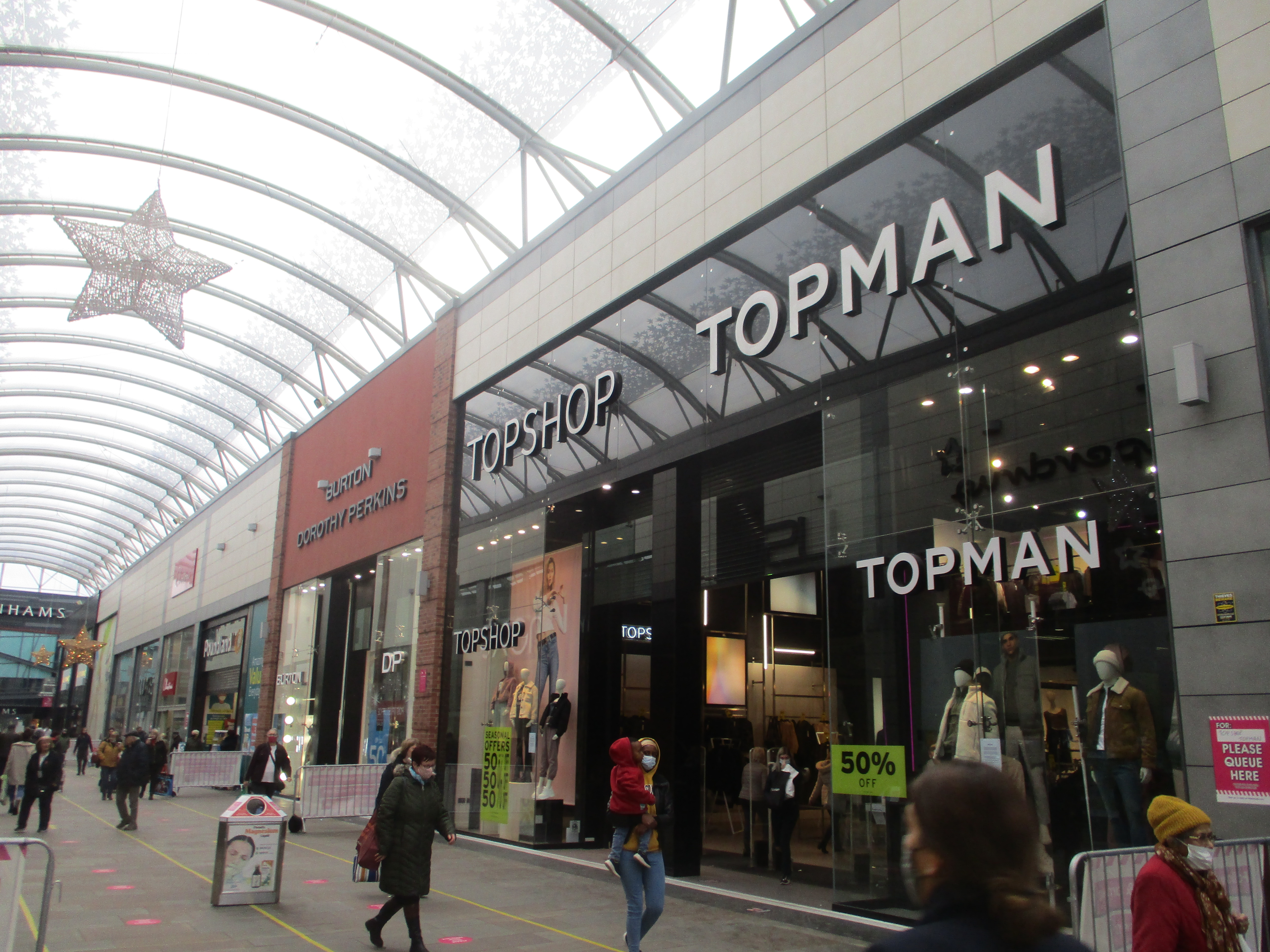
Arcadia Group shops at Trinity Walk in Wakefield, West Yorkshire.

Arcadia's brands, including Dorothy Perkins, were mainly supplied by International Clothing Designs, a company owned by Philip Green's long-time friend Richard Caring, owner of the Annabel's nightclub.

All of Arcadia's brands were sold during January and February 2021 to online retailers, meaning that the related stores closed. Outfit, out-of-town stores carrying various Arcadia brands but not a clothing brand in its own right, closed in January 2021.

=== Former operations ===
- Debenhams – demerged in 1998, entered liquidation late 2020 - sold to Boohoo
- Etam UK – closed shortly after purchase
- Hawkshead – sold to Rubicon Retail
- Innovations – sold to GUS in 1997
- Peter Robinson – became Topshop
- Principles – sold to Rubicon Retail; subsequently owned by Debenhams
- Principles for Men – closed
- Racing Green – sold to Rubicon Retail
- Richards – closed shortly after purchase
- SU214 – closed
- Wade Smith – sold circa 2002
- BHS – sold to Retail Acquisitions Ltd in March 2015 but ceased trading in 2016
- Warehouse – sold to Rubicon Retail
- Topshop and Topman – sold to ASOS
- Evans – sold to City Chic now owned by AK Retail
- Miss Selfridge – sold to ASOS
- Burton – sold to Boohoo
- Wallis – sold to Boohoo
- Dorothy Perkins – sold to Boohoo
- Outfit – Brand used for UK stores that sold multiple Arcada brands as well as selected external brands. Liquidated when the main Arcadia business entered administration.

== Controversies ==
=== BHS ===
The Green family bought BHS for £200m in 2000, and it became part of the Arcadia Group in 2009, before being sold in 2015 for £1 to Dominic Chappell.

By the time of its sale to Chappell, the company had a pension deficit of £571m. This deficit was attributed to Green having paid dividends to his family and to Richard Caring. Caring, a personal friend of Philip Green, secretly owned a stake in BHS in the early 2000s, and was awarded £93m in dividends.
