= Paul Budge =

British businessman (b.1955)

- Born: Paul Everard Budge; May 1955 (age 70–71)
- Occupation: Accountant
- Employer: Arcadia Group
- Known for: Arcardia Group; BHS
- Title: Finance director
- Term: since 31 March 2003
- Board member of: Arcadia Group

Paul Everard Budge (born May 1955) is a British businessman, the finance director of the Arcadia Group since 31 March 2003.

Paul Everard Budge was born in May 1955.

In July 2004, Budge and his then colleague Gillian Hague gave evidence to the Select Committee on Treasury on the issue of store cards.

Since October 2009, Budge was also finance director of BHS.

In April 2016, Budge was quoted as describing BHS, "like Woolworths and Littlewoods ... past its sell-by date".
