= Labour Behind the Label =

British workers' rights organisation

- Fair trade activist Sabeena Ahmed, 2020
- Abbreviation: LBL
- Established: March 2000; 26 years ago
- Type: Umbrella organisation
- Registration no.: 4173634
- Headquarters: The Old Co-op; 38-42 Chelsea Road; Easton, Bristol, BS5 6AF
- Coordinates: 51.4635406°N 2.5654911°W
- Origins: Fair trade, labour movement
- Methods: Consumer education, corporate research, protests
- Fields: Garment industry
- Affiliations: Clean Clothes Campaign
- Website: labourbehindthelabel.org

Labour Behind the Label (LBL) is a UK-based non-profit co-operative organisation with an office in Easton, Bristol, which campaigns for workers' rights in the clothing industry. It is the platform of the international Clean Clothes Campaign in the United Kingdom. LBL's members include trade unions and their local branches, consumer organisations, campaign groups, and charities.

Its main activities are consumer education, lobbying companies, lobbying government, and solidarity with workers in disputes in factories producing for UK clothing companies.

== History ==
Labour Behind the Label was involved with the global 'Play Fair at the Olympics' campaign in 2004, which brought together trade unions and campaign groups to call for greater action from the Olympic movement and the sportswear industry on workers' rights.

== Reports ==
Labour Behind the Label carries out research and produces reports. It has produced, on its own or in conjunction with other organisations, the following reports that were reported on in national media:

- Fashion Victims: The True Cost of Cheap Clothes at Primark, Asda and Tesco (2006) in conjunction with War On Want and Alternative Movement for Resources and Freedom Society (AMRF). (Note: The Fashion Victims report is available in the LBL site here) The Guardian reported that this "brought huge public attention".
- Let's Clean Up Fashion (2007), in conjunction with War on Want, revealed that workers making clothes for British high street stores receive around half of the money they need to live a decent life. (Note: The Let's Clean Up Fashion report is available in the LBL site here)
- Asia Floor Wage (2009) calculated a wage it says should be used as a minimum for workers in Asia, enough to pay for food, water, clothing, housing, taxes, utilities, healthcare and education, that would prevent countries competing at the expense of workers. (Note: The Asia Floor Wage report is available in the LBL site here)
- Taking Liberties: the Story Behind the UK High Street (2010) in conjunction with War on Want, describes "how Marks & Spencer, Next, Monsoon, Debenhams, Dorothy Perkins and Miss Selfridge ... use Indian sweatshops which pay poverty wages and break labour laws to keep costs to a bare minimum." (Note: The Taking Liberties report is available in the LBL site here)
- Killer Jeans (2011) about companies such as Asda, Diesel, Matalan and Primark selling jeans made using sandblasting to give denim a worn look, and how silica dust from the sand can get into workers' lungs, causing silicosis and possibly death. (Note: The Killer Jeans report is available in the LBL site here)

== Labour Behind the Label Trust ==
The Labour Behind the Label Trust is a separate organisation who raise funds for Labour Behind the Label's charitable activities. The Trust is a charity, independent of Labour Behind the Label, but the two organisations work together closely.
