= Coast (clothing) =

British women's clothing retail chain

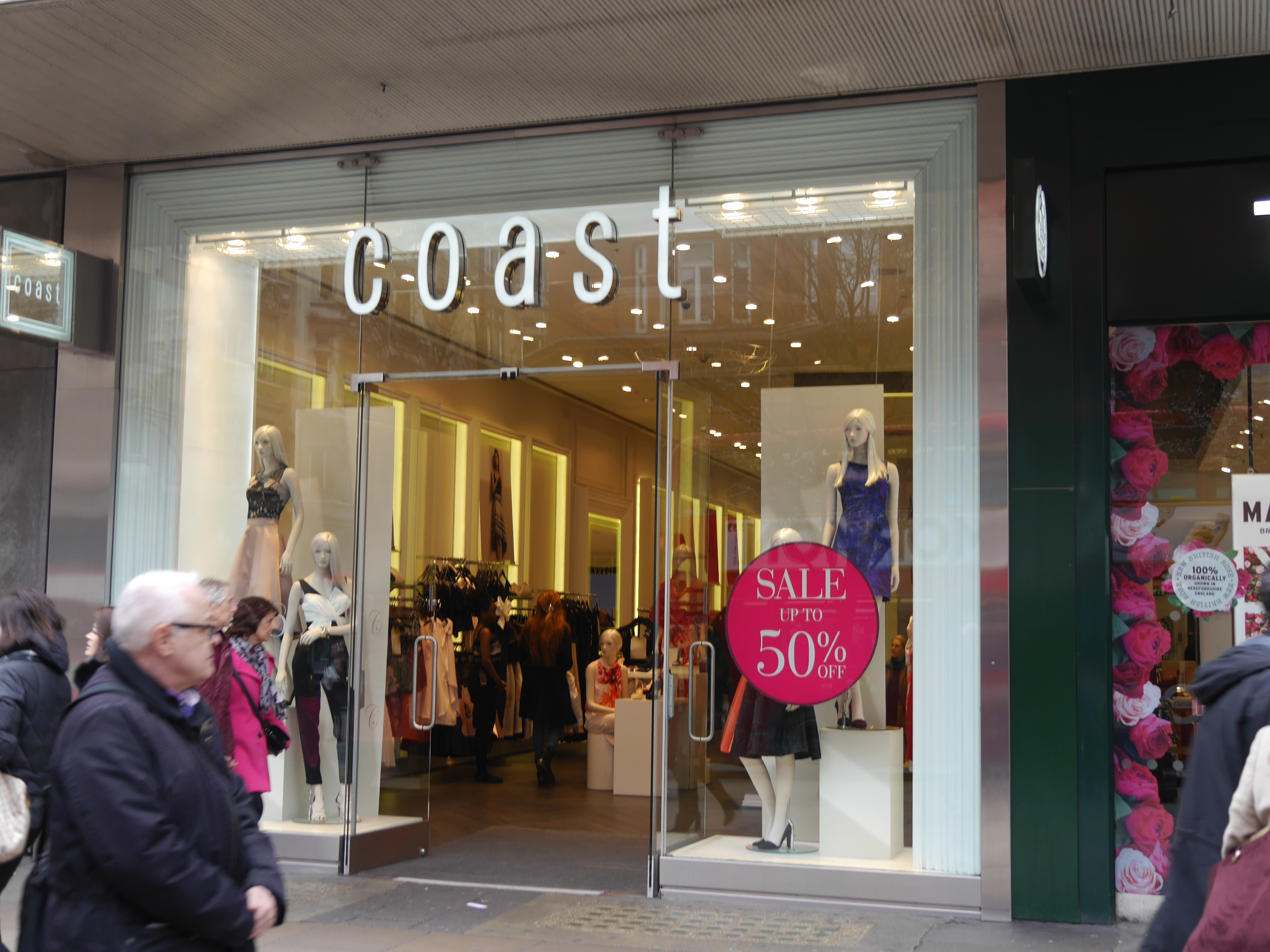
Coast store, Oxford Street, London, 2016

Coast is a British women's clothing retail chain, founded in 1996.

Coast was owned by Aurora Fashions, along with fashion brands Warehouse and Oasis. Aurora in turn was owned by the Icelandic Kaupthing Bank, and had been in administration for some time, with the administrators looking for potential buyers, with a possible valuation of not more than £100 million for Coast, Warehouse, and Oasis reported in November 2016. In April 2017, The Daily Telegraph reported that the three brands employ up to 5,000 people and were attracting interest from private equity, who would likely close some of the stores. Retail Week speculated that the future for brands like Coast will be in department store concessions and online, rather than stand-alone stores.

In 2016, Coast had a pre-tax profit of £1.3m, following a pre-tax loss of £10.8m in 2015.

As of September 2017, they had 20 stand-alone stores in the UK, five in Ireland, two in Kuwait, and two in the UAE, as well as numerous in-house concessions in Beatties, Debenhams, House of Fraser and John Lewis.

== Administration and sale ==
On 11 October 2018, Coast entered administration. Karen Millen, another British retailer, bought parts of the Coast brand, such as the website and concessions in department stores (including the transfer of 600 jobs to Karen Millen). The deal left 24 stores to close, including the flagship store on Oxford Street, and 300 employees without a job.

Coast is now an online only retail business owned by Debenhams, a subsidiary of Debenhams Group (formerly Boohoo Group), with all retail shops and concession stands having been closed.
