= Mosaic Fashions =

Company of several fashion brands

- Industry: Fashion retail
- Founded: 2003
- Defunct: 2009
- Fate: Administration
- Successor: Aurora Fashions
- Headquarters: Iceland; UK
- Number of locations: 1700+
- Area served: International
- Products: Clothes

Mosaic Fashions hf was a holding company listed on the Icelandic stock exchange that owned several fashion brands. At its peak, it had over 2,000 stores worldwide, as concessions, franchises and joint venture stores.

== History ==
=== Oasis ===
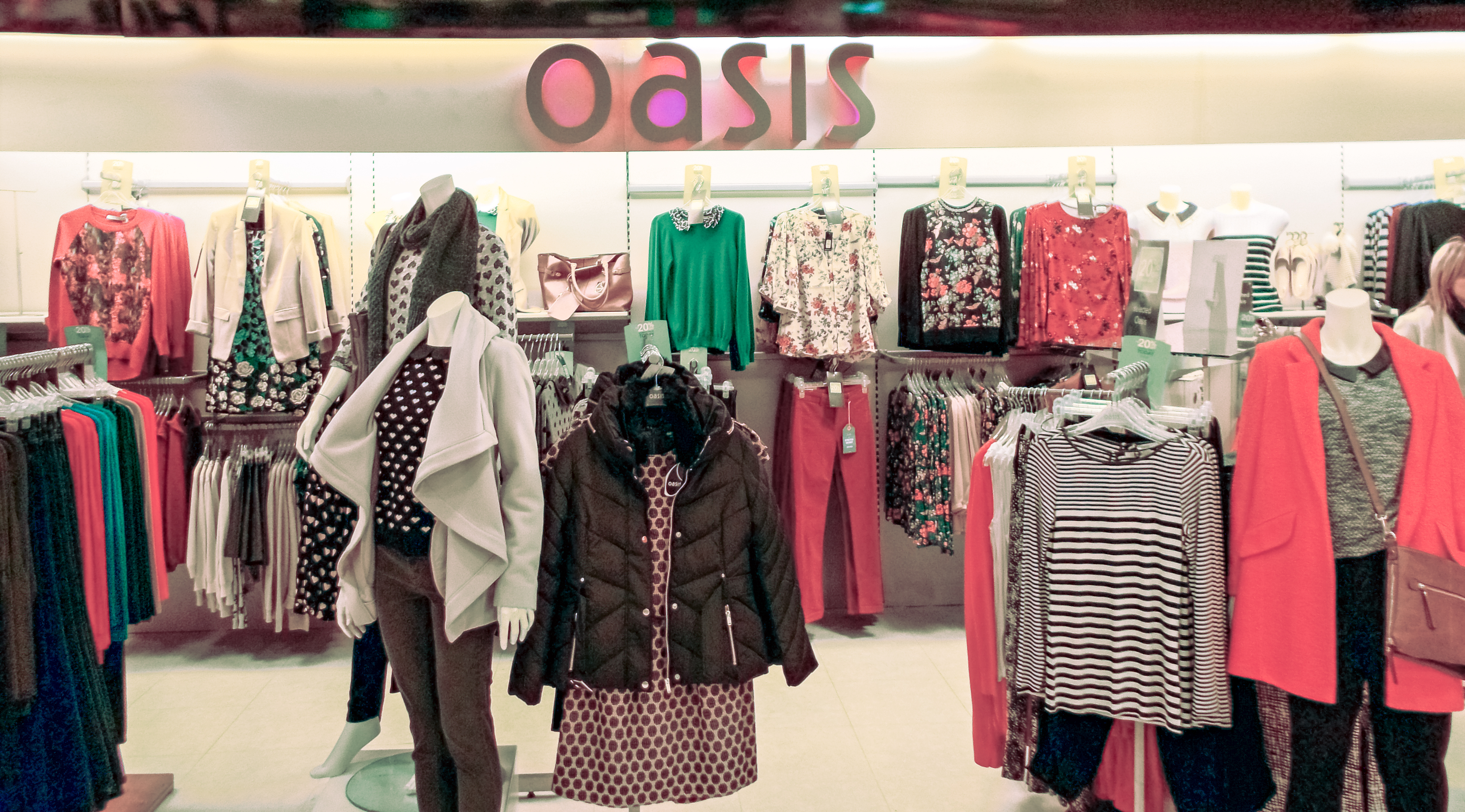
Oasis concession in Debenhams, Sutton, Greater London

The Oasis stores started in 1991, and in 1995 Oasis Stores Plc. was floated on the London Stock Exchange. In April 1998, Oasis purchased the Coast stores. In September 2001, the management team of Oasis Stores Plc acquired the company via Sierra Acquisitions Ltd., supported by PPM Ventures. Sierra Acquisitions Ltd. later became a part of Sierra Holdings Ltd.

On 16 April 2020, it was announced that both Oasis and Warehouse had fallen into administration. On 30 April 2020, the administrators announced that they had failed to find a buyer for both stores with the loss of 1,800 jobs. The brand was later bought by Boohoo Group (now Debenhams Group).

=== Mosaic Fashions ===
In November 2003, Oasis and Coast were acquired from PPM Ventures by a secondary management buyout, supported by Baugur Group hf. and an investor group led by Kaupthing Bank hf. Noel Ltd. was established as the takeover vehicle, which in June 2004 was renamed Mosaic Fashions, when it acquired the Karen Millen and Whistles brands. The company was backed by a series of investors, including Jón Ásgeir Jóhannesson, Don McCarthy and Kevin Stanford.

In 2005, Mosaic Fashions hf. was listed on the OMX Exchanges in Iceland. In 2006, Mosaic Fashions hf. acquired Rubicon Retail, which included the Warehouse, Principles and Shoe Studio brands. In October 2007, Mosaic Fashions was de-listed from the Nordic Stock Exchange. In December 2007, the eveningwear brand Anoushka G was acquired. In January 2008, its interest in Whistles was disposed of.

=== Insolvency and Aurora Fashions ===
Mosaic Fashion entered administration on 2 March 2009. Most of the businesses were immediately sold on to Aurora Fashions, a new company jointly owned by Icelandic bank Kaupthing - a major Mosaic creditor - and Mosaic's former management. The deal saw Aurora take on the majority of Mosaic's ongoing retail stores including Coast, Warehouse and Oasis. Principles was not included in this deal, and was subsequently purchased separately by department store operator Debenhams.

== Brands ==
The group traded under the following brand names:

- Anoushka G
- Coast
- Karen Millen
- Oasis
- Odille
- Principles
- Shoe Studio Group
- Warehouse
