= Warehouse (clothing) =

Retail chain in the United Kingdom

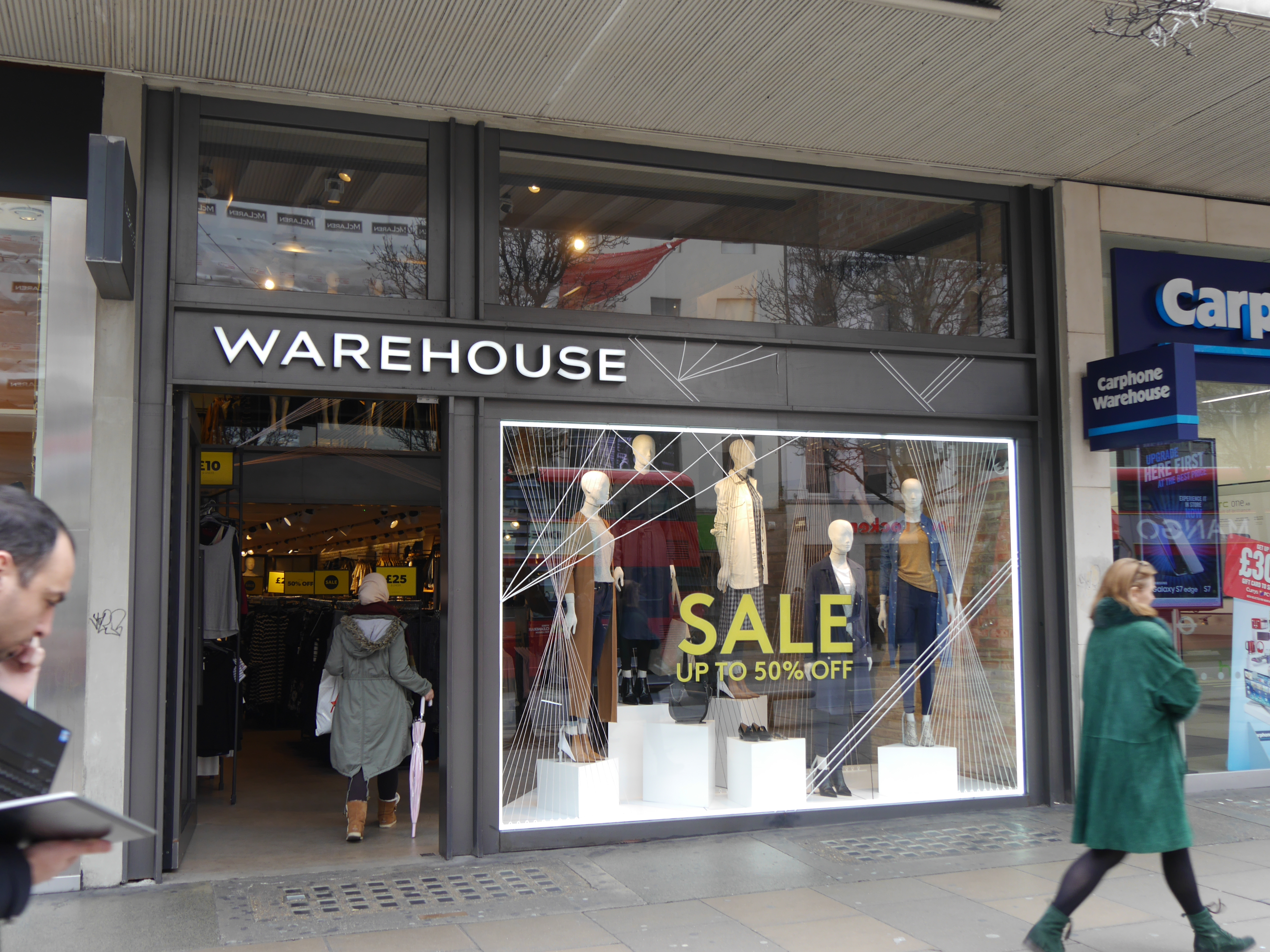
- Warehouse store, Oxford Street, London, 2016
- Industry: Clothing retailer
- Founded: 1976
- Defunct: April 2020
- Fate: Administration, converted into an online store
- Owner: Debenhams Group
- Parent: Debenhams
- Website: www.warehouse.co.uk

Warehouse was a British clothing retail chain, founded in 1976.

Warehouse was owned by Aurora Fashions, as were women's fashion brands Coast and Oasis.

In November 2016, the administrator for Aurora Fashions, Kaupthing Bank, placed the retailers up for a £100 million sale.

On 16 April 2020, it was announced that both Warehouse and Oasis had fallen into administration. On 30 April 2020, it was announced that administrators had failed to find a buyer with the loss of 1,800 jobs.

In June 2020, the Warehouse brand, assets and stock, along with those of the Oasis chain, were acquired by online retailer Boohoo Group (now Debenhams Group), reuniting Warehouse with former sibling Coast, acquired by Boohoo as part of a separate takeover of the Karen Millen Group in 2019.
