= Nasty Gal =

American fashion retailer

Nasty Gal Inc.
- Type: Subsidiary
- Industry: Apparel
- Founded: 2006; 20 years ago
- Founder: Sophia Amoruso
- Headquarters: Los Angeles, California, U.S.
- Key people: Robert Ross, CFO; Sheree Waterson, CEO
- Products: Apparel, accessories
- Revenue: ▲£98.8 million
- Owner: Debenhams Group
- Number of employees: 200 est. (2014)
- Parent: Debenhams
- Website: nastygal.com

Nasty Gal is an American fast-fashion retailer that specializes in fashion for young women. The company has customers in over 60 countries. Founded by Sophia Amoruso in 2006, Nasty Gal was named "Fastest Growing Retailer" in 2012 by Inc. magazine. Nasty Gal is based in Los Angeles. In 2017, the company was acquired for $40 million by British retailer BooHoo Group following its Chapter 11 bankruptcy.

== History ==
In 2006, while working as a campus safety host at Academy of Art University, Amoruso launched an eBay store based in San Francisco, selling old pieces of clothing. The store was named Nasty Gal Vintage after the album by Betty Davis. The eBay store sold vintage fashion that Amoruso sourced from secondhand stores.

MySpace was the primary form of communication for the store in its early days. In June 2008, Amoruso moved Nasty Gal Vintage off eBay and onto its own destination site. In 2009, Nasty Gal moved into its first warehouse space in Berkeley, California, and soon after to a 7,500-square-foot warehouse in Emeryville, California. Amoruso has emphasized in interviews the importance of social media to Nasty Gal's growth.

In 2010, Nasty Gal moved its headquarters to Los Angeles, California. The company received $9 million in investments in early 2012, followed by $40 million in August 2012 from venture capital firm Index Ventures.

By 2012, the online retailer employed approximately 110 people and had opened an additional distribution center in Shepherdsville, Kentucky, while its 2011 revenue reached $24 million, marking an 11,200% three-year growth rate.

In 2014, Nasty Gal opened its first brick and mortar store on Melrose Avenue in Los Angeles. The store had Nasty Gal footwear, apparel, accessories and intimates.

On January 12, 2015, Amoruso announced that Sheree Waterson would take over as CEO of Nasty Gal. Waterson, formerly president of Nasty Gal, became partners with Amoruso to increase the scale of its retail presence. Amoruso continued as founder and executive chairman. Waterson also joined the Nasty Gal board of directors alongside Amoruso and Index Ventures partner, Danny Rimer.

In March 2015, a second brick-and-mortar store opened in Santa Monica.

In 2016, Nasty Gal filed for bankruptcy. The British-owned BooHoo Group announced in February 2017 that they had purchased Nasty Gal.

In November 2017, Nasty Gal opened its first UK pop-up shop on London's Carnaby Street.

== Controversies ==
In 2015, a lawsuit was filed accusing Nasty Gal of allegedly firing four employees because of pregnancy, in violation of California laws.

It has faced criticism online in a variety of publications due to its allegedly "toxic" work environment and numerous negative reviews on Glassdoor from unhappy employees.

== Original collections ==
Nasty Gal's original label launched in 2012 and consists of limited-edition styles. In September 2012, Nasty Gal debuted its first Fall/Winter 2012 Collection, Weird Science, during New York Fashion Week. Since then, the company has continued to launch various collections. It launched its first footwear collection, Shoe Cult by Nasty Gal, in August 2013. In 2014, Nasty Gal debuted three additional in-house collections: the vintage-inspired Nasty Gal Denim Collection, Nasty Gal Swimwear, and Nasty Gal Lingerie. Nasty Gal also collaborated on a swimwear line with Minimale Animale in 2014. They collaborated with M∙A∙C Cosmetics on a capsule collection of lipsticks and nail polish in December 2014.

== Expansion into publishing ==
In 2012, the company released the first issue of what was planned to be a semiannual "lifestyle magazine", titled Super Nasty, which featured spreads on "fashion, music and culture," and was included free in customers' orders. Amoruso functioned as an editor-in-chief. Contributors and photographers for the first issue included Terry Richardson, Hugh Lippe, Jeff Hahn, Alexandra Richards, Syd tha Kyd, Langley Hemingway, and Girls writer Lesley Arfin.

The second issue was in spring 2013 and included Kesh, model Sidney Williams, Io Echo, Haley Wollens, Phoebe Collings-James, Charli XCX, and Akiko Matsuura.

In 2014, Nasty Gal founder Amoruso published the book #GIRLBOSS. Following the book's release, Amoruso launched the GIRLBOSS Foundation to inspire women to take their careers into their own hands. The foundation awards grants each quarter to women with creative projects.

In April 2017, Netflix released a show, Girlboss, loosely based on the book. The series was cancelled after season 1.
