= Adam Kamani =

English businessman

- Born: 5 June 1989 (age 37)
- Occupation: Businessman
- Known for: Co-founder of PrettyLittleThing; CEO of Kamani Property Group
- Parent: Mahmud Kamani
- Relatives: Umar Kamani (brother)

Adam Kamani (born June 1989) is an English businessman. He is the chief executive officer of Kamani Property Group and KM Capital, and a co-founder of PrettyLittleThing.

Kamani grew up in Chorlton. His grandfather, Abdullah Kamani, emigrated from Kenya to the United Kingdom in the 1960s with his wife and four children. Kamani was educated at Cheadle Hulme School and Wilmslow High School. He later enrolled at Sheffield Hallam University to study international hospitality business but left the programme after moving abroad. In 2012, Kamani co-founded the fashion company Pretty Little Thing with his brother Umar Kamani, which focused on fashion accessories. In 2017, Boohoo group acquired a majority stake in the company.
