= Don McCarthy =

British entrepreneur and philanthropist (1955–2018)

Don McCarthy CBE
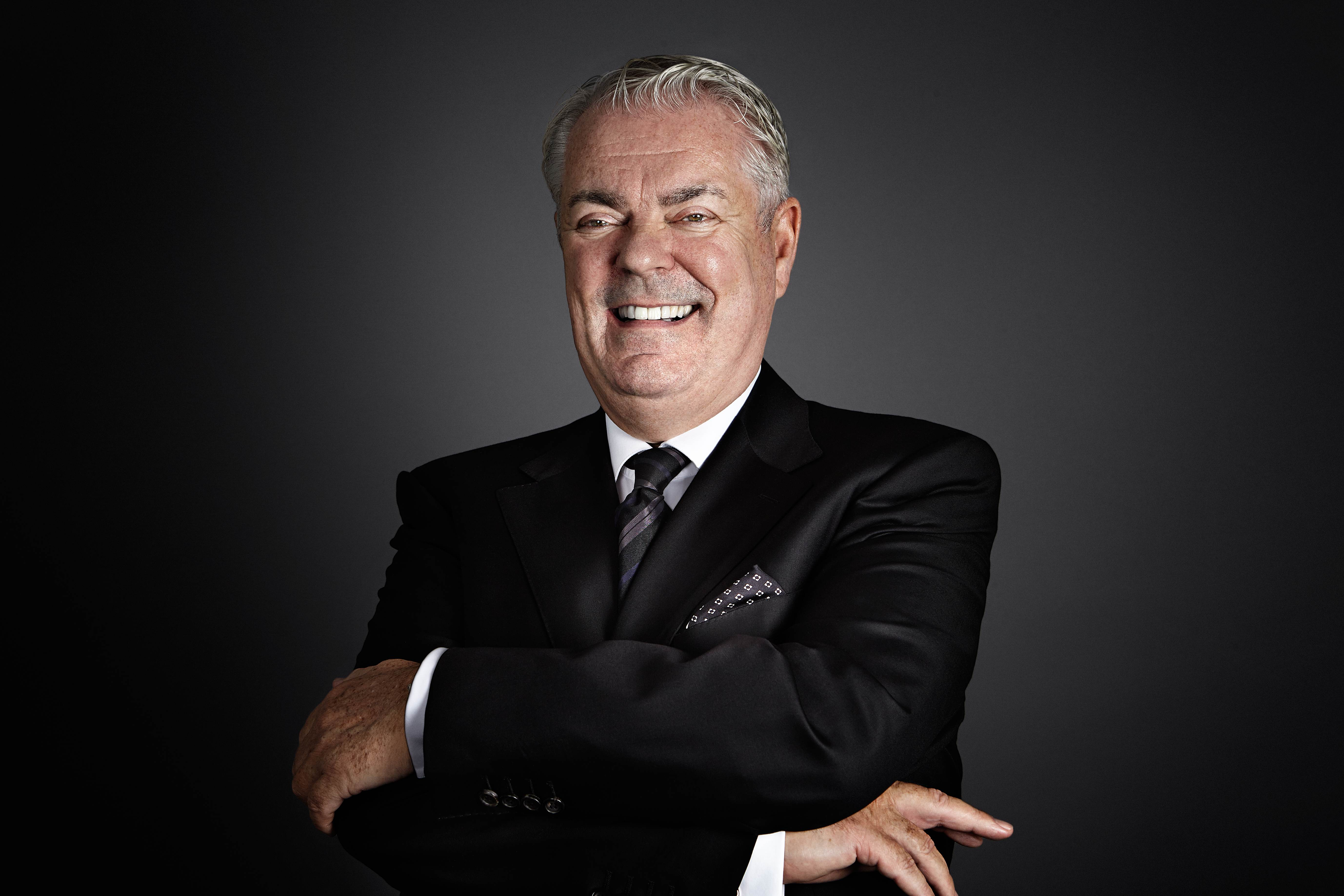
- Born: Donald McCarthy; 19 June 1955; Bromley, England
- Died: 21 July 2018 (aged 63); England

Donald McCarthy, CBE (19 June 1955 – 21 July 2018) was a British entrepreneur and philanthropist. He was most known for having been the chairman of House of Fraser.

== Career ==
McCarthy left school when he was 15 and joined footwear retailer Stead & Simpson as a full-time sales assistant and progressed to store management positions. In 1975, at the age of 20, he joined Kurt Geiger at its central London flagship store in Bond Street, central London. McCarthy was part of a team that developed Kurt Geiger's mid-range shoe brand Carvela and in 1991 he founded and became chief executive officer of The Shoe Studio Group, a multi-brand concession footwear retailer. In 1996 The Shoe Studio Group was acquired by Nine West Inc. In 2001, McCarthy led a management buyout from Nine West.

In 2005, McCarthy organised the acquisition by Shoe Studio Group of Rubicon Retail for £140m. As the major and leading shareholder, he became chairman and chief executive of the enlarged group. In 2006 McCarthy stepped down from the board after Rubicon Retail was acquired by Mosaic Fashions. At the end of 2006, McCarthy headed a consortium of investors that acquired House of Fraser and he was appointed executive chairman. In May 2011, in the aftermath of the financial crisis in 2008, McCarthy and his team secured the replacement of the company's debt with a long-term bond. He then led negotiations with Yuan Yafei, the chairman of Chinese conglomerate Sanpower, which in July 2014 acquired 89% of the shares in House of Fraser through its subsidiary Nanjing Cenbest. In September 2014, McCarthy stepped down as executive chairman of House of Fraser to concentrate on his family's new investment vehicle, No.9 Investments.

From 2007 until 2012 McCarthy also was chairman of Aurum, a British watch and jewellery retailer. Aurum was acquired by US private equity firm Apollo Global Management in December 2012. McCarthy, who had controlled 25% of the shares, left Aurum after the Apollo acquisition.

He was the founding patron of the British School of Fashion in New York, an offshoot of GCU, which was opened in 2013.

== Philanthropy ==
McCarthy's wife Diane Agnew died of cancer in 2007. That year McCarthy donated £1m to The Royal Marsden, a cancer hospital in London, which treated Diane. In spring 2015, McCarthy and his family donated a further £1.5m for to the hospital.

McCarthy was a patron and ambassador of the retailing trade charity Retail Trust. In January 2015 he received its Retail Legend award.

== Awards and honours ==
McCarthy appeared in the top 25 of Drapers' Top 100 most influential people in fashion retailing since it began in 2002. In June 2015 he received the Lifetime Achievement Award at the Drapers Footwear Awards.

In November 2010 McCarthy was awarded an Honorary Doctorate by Glasgow Caledonian University.

McCarthy was appointed Commander of the Order of the British Empire (CBE) in the 2017 New Year Honours for services to business and philanthropy.
