= Revolution Beauty =

British beauty products company

- Company type: PLC
- Website type: Online shopping
- Founded: 2014
- Headquarters: Kent & London, {{{location_country}}}
- Owner: Revolution Beauty Group PLC
- Founders: Adam Minto and Tom Allsworth
- CEO: Lauren Brindley
- Products: Cosmetics
- Employees: 337
- Website: www.revolutionbeauty.com

Revolution Beauty is a UK-based beauty company that was founded in 2014 by Adam Minto and Tom Allsworth. It sells makeup, skincare and hair products. As of 2021, the brand has 220 employees and an annual turnover of $139 million. Their products are sold online as well as in Boots, Superdrug, Ulta and Target stores.

== History ==
Revolution Beauty claims to be based around the principles of inclusivity and affordability in makeup, with a diverse range of affordable products.

The brand is known for its use of influencer marketing, and social media, particularly Instagram and TikTok.

The company has faced claims from brands such as Kat Von D and beauty YouTuber Manny MUA for allegedly plagiarizing makeup designs and concepts, claims which co-founder Adam Minto denies.

All Revolution products are all cruelty free, with 76% of the brand stocking vegan products.

In 2019, Revolution Beauty was named within the Sunday Times Fast Track 100 as the fastest growing beauty brand in the UK.

In 2021, Revolution Beauty made its stock market debut, with Jupiter Asset Management and Chrysalis Investments pledging shares. In March 2021, the company appointed Dave Forsey as its new Managing Director.

In July 2023, Revolution's chief executive and chairman, Bob Holt, was ousted in a boardroom coup led by the company's major shareholder, Boohoo. Later that year in December 2023, the company's chief financial officer stepped down.
