= Chrysalis Investments =

British investment trust

- Type: Public
- Traded as: LSE: CHRY
- Industry: Investment management
- Headquarters: United Kingdom,
- Key people: Andrew Haining (Chairman)
- Website: www.chrysalisinvestments.co.uk

Chrysalis Investments (previously known as Merian Chrysalis) is a large British investment trust dedicated to investing in a portfolio of UK and European private companies with long-term growth potential. The company is listed on the London Stock Exchange.

== History ==
The company was established in November 2018. The company was managed by Merian Global Investors until July 2020, when Merian was acquired by Jupiter Fund Management. The chairman is Andrew Haining.

In December 2025, the company proposed a wind down and return of capital over the following three years.
