= Dave Forsey =

British businessperson

David Forsey
- Occupation: Businessman
- Known for: Former CEO, Sports Direct
- Successor: Mike Ashley
- Spouse: Stacey Forsey

David Forsey is a British businessman and the former chief executive of Sports Direct until September 2016.

== Career ==
Forsey started working for Mike Ashley at the age of 18, and continued for 32 years.

In 2015, Sports Direct subsidiary USC, a clothing retailer, went into administration. In the two preceding months leases for many of USC's stores were transferred to another subsidiary, Republic, and the USC trademark was transferred to another Sports Direct company. In October 2015 Forsey was charged with a criminal offence for consultation failures over USC staff who only had 15 minutes notice of redundancy.

In September 2016, Forsey resigned as chief executive of Sports Direct.

In May 2017 The Sunday Times reported that Forsey will be prosecuted over the collapse of USC. He had previously tried to block the prosecution through a judicial review.

In March 2021, Forsey was appointed as managing director of Revolution Beauty.

== Personal life ==
Forsey is married to Stacey Forsey, who has starred in The Real Housewives of Cheshire.
