= PrettyLittleThing =

UK-based fashion retailer

PrettyLittleThing.com Limited
- Trade name: PrettyLittleThing
- Type: Subsidiary
- Industry: Fashion
- Founded: 2012; 14 years ago
- Founders: Umar Kamani; Adam Kamani
- Headquarters: Manchester, England
- Number of locations: Manchester, England; Los Angeles, California, US; Paris, France
- Area served: Worldwide
- Key people: Umar Kamani; Paul Papworth
- Products: Clothing
- Revenue: ▲£516.3 million (2020)
- Parent: Debenhams Group
- Website: prettylittlething.com

PrettyLittleThing.com Limited, trading as PrettyLittleThing, is a UK-based fast-fashion retailer. The company is owned by Debenhams Group and operates in the UK, Ireland, Australia, US, France, Middle East and North Africa. The brand's headquarters are in Manchester. PrettyLittleThing has offices in London, Paris and Los Angeles.

== History ==
PrettyLittleThing was co-founded in 2012 by brothers Umar and Adam Kamani. It started with an accessory only brand with limited products on the site. Since then, the company has expanded and now operates internationally; including the US, Irish, Australian, Middle East, French and Canadian markets. The company sells womenswear, footwear, accessories and beauty products. Celebrities, including Miley Cyrus, Michelle Keegan, Rita Ora, Jessie J and Nicki Minaj, were seen wearing their products.

In February 2017, the company reported sales of £47.7m. In September 2015, it launched its mobile application in the UK market.

In 2016, the brand partnered with ASOS and Lipsy on their website, as well as through the retailer Next. At this time, the brand also launched their USA site which was celebrated with a Los Angeles party hosted by Kylie Jenner.

PrettyLittleThing was owned by the Kamani brothers until January 2017, before being acquired by their father Mahmud Kamani's company Boohoo. It acquired 66% stake in the PrettyLittleThing.

Throughout 2017, the PrettyLittleThing French website was launched as well as PLT Plus (plus size clothing ranging from 18-30). In November 2017, the firm drew press attention when it was named one of the top-three fastest-growing fashion companies by Hitwise.

In February 2019, the brand opened their Los Angeles office on Melrose Avenue. September 2019, PrettyLittleThing debuted at NYFW with their exclusive collaboration with American rapper and singer, Saweetie.

In 2020, BooHoo (now named Debenhams Group) acquired the remainder of PrettyLittleThing. In March 2020, the brand opened their Paris showroom with a collaboration with the French YouTuber Sananas.

In June 2020, PrettyLittleThing launched their Middle Eastern website.

During August 2023, BooHoo Group opened their first US distribution centre. The one-million-square-foot warehouse located in Elizabeth Town, Philadelphia is set to considerably reduce delivery times for American shoppers. Alongside the warehouse launch, PrettyLittleThing hosted their East Coast Student Pop Up Tour. The tour saw a pink branded school bus travel across 12 US states and hosted pop ups at a total of 19 college campuses.

In March 2025, PrettyLittleThing underwent a rebrand changing its colours to burgundy and a more muted pastel pink. This sparked controversy as people complained it was trying to go on the bandwagon of quiet luxury.

The launch was said to be a new era of PrettyLittleThing with the tagline, The Style Source for Every Kind of IT Girl.

Since rebrand, the brand has continued with key campaign focuses including Label which is the brands elevated occasion wear offering as well as the launch of the PrettyLittleThing Heath & Social Club which was announced in June 2025. This includes monthly athleisure launches as well as community events (both customer and influencer focused).

== Collaborations ==
In October and November 2015, PrettyLittleThing launched collections with reality actress Lucy Mecklenburgh. They collaborated with American reality television personality Kylie Jenner, who hosted a launch party in Los Angeles.

In October 2016, PrettyLittleThing launched their party wear collection with Sofia Richie. They signed LA influencer Chantel Jeffries as their brand ambassador. In August 2017, the online retailer launched a collection with American personality Olivia Culpo. In October 2017, PrettyLittleThing launched a collection with American reality television personality and businesswoman Kourtney Kardashian. In May 2018, the brand announced a collaboration with streetwear label Karl Kani with a collection fronted by Teyana Taylor. In June 2018, the brand launched a collaboration with British television and radio presenter Maya Jama In September 2018, PrettyLittleThing teamed up with American model Ashley Graham to launch a collection for sizes 6–28. In November 2018, the brand launched a collection with Hailey Baldwin as the face of their Christmas campaign.

In February 2019, the brand launched a second collection with American model Ashley Graham.

In June 2019, PrettyLittleThing launched a summer collaboration with American singer, songwriter, record producer Ashanti. 2019 also saw the brand launch second collections with Maya Jama and Karl Kani. In September 2019 PrettyLittleThing launched a collaboration with UK Love Island star Molly-Mae Hague. PrettyLittleThing hosted their first catwalk in New York Fashion Week, releasing their collaboration with Saweetie. In November 2019, they launched a collection with British girl group Little Mix.

PrettyLittleThing launched a collection in June 2020 with proceeds donated to The Solutions Not Punishment Collaborative (SNaP Co), a Black trans-led organisation aimed at transforming material realities for Black transgender people. June 2020 also saw the launch of a second collaboration with Saweetie, with all proceeds going to Black Lives Matter. In September 2020 PrettyLittleThing launched their second collaboration with UK Love Island star Molly-Mae Hague. October 2020 saw the brand team up and collaborate with entrepreneur Jordyn Woods.

In November 2020, PrettyLittleThing released their collaboration with Lil Kim. November also saw the brand launch their homeware collection with PLT Home. In December 2020, Teyana Taylor was announced as Creative Director.

January 2021, saw the launch of PrettyLittleThing x Teyana Taylor.

In August 2021, they announced Molly-Mae Hague as their new Creative Director. Molly-Mae has since stepped down from the role to prioritise her life as a mother, which was announced in June 2023.

In 2022, PrettyLittleThing launched its marketplace which allows customers to re-sell their old clothes. In September 2022, PrettyLittleThing announced UK Love Island cast member Indiyah Polack as their newest Brand Ambassador. Polack has since been a prominent face of the PrettyLittleThing brand.

In September 2023, the firm launched a worldwide campaign with supermodel Naomi Campbell.

With the rebrand in March 2025, PrettyLittleThing teamed with Elsa Hosk who was the face of the launch.

Since rebrand, PrettyLittleThing have continued to team with influencer talent including edits with Tia Lineker (June 2025) and fashion muse, Leonie Hanne who was the face of their partywear collection.

July 2025 saw Alexandra Saint Mleux, partner of Charles Leclerc wearing PrettyLittleThing at the British Grand Prix.

== Controversy ==
On November 26, 2021, PrettyLittleThing launched 'Pink Friday' (which was a play on Black Friday), where the fast-fashion brand discounted merchandise up to 100% off. This sale caused a controversy with many sustainable shoppers and activists, who pointed out the poor wages of workers and large amounts of waste that PrettyLittleThing contributes to landfills in Africa. This resulted in the critics who questioned the brand's actions over social media being blocked by Umar Kamani.

In 2023, PrettyLittleThing was criticised for its "inappropriate" outfits offered to Muslim shoppers celebrating the end of Ramadan.
