= Wallis (retailer) =

British online women's clothing retailer

Wallis Fashion & Clothing Group
- Type: Private
- Industry: Women's Clothing; Fashion
- Founded: Chapel Market, Islington, London, United Kingdom in 1923
- Founder: Raphael Nat Wallis
- Defunct: 2021 (Stores)
- Fate: Converted into an online store
- Successor: www.wallis.co.uk
- Headquarters: London, United Kingdom
- Products: Clothing; Accessories; Shoes
- Owner: Debenhams Group
- Parent: Debenhams
- Website: wallis.co.uk

Wallis is a British online women's clothing brand operated by Debenhams Group in the United Kingdom.

Previously a retailer, Wallis operated from 134 stores and 126 concessions across the UK and Republic of Ireland. Wallis was a subsidiary of the Arcadia Group before its collapse in late 2020. The brand is now owned by Debenhams.

== History ==
The first Wallis store was opened by its namesake founder, Raphael Nat Wallis, in Chapel Market, Islington in 1923. Known from the start for its coats (sold originally for 19 shillings) and dresses, it had the slogan: 'Comparison invited. Competition defied". By the 1940s, the chain had 25 shops and a turnover of £300,000 a year.

=== 1960s fashion success ===
From the 1950s, under the leadership of Jeffrey Wallis, son of the founder, the company became known for its selections from Paris – from 1957 this was known as 'pick of Paris', later this became 'Paris Originals' – and produced exact copies of top couture clothes. Paying a fee to attend the fashion shows of names such as Courrèges, Chanel and Dior, Wallis buyers were then entitled to reproduce a small number of patterns from each show – in practice, another dozen or so would be recreated from memory. The store's mannequins would wear canvas covers in the run up to a grand unveiling of the latest designs. The copies of Chanel suits created by the store attracted a loyal following among London socialites and working women alike. During the Profumo affair trial, Christine Keeler wore a different Wallis outfit every day.

From the late 1960s, the focus was on younger British designers – in keeping with Swinging London trends. Wallis had already attracted interest from foreign buyers and took a collection of clothing to the US at the request of American buyers in 1964. It comprised some 70 coats, suits and dresses.

In 1969, Sylvia Ayton – formerly in partnership with Zandra Rhodes – took over as head of outerwear at Wallis. She would attend the Paris fashion shows with Jeffrey Wallis and take notes, afterwards deciding which designs would be copied. Then they would return to look at them on the hanger and take measurements. Ayton recalled: "At Saint Laurent, you were only allowed to look, so I would measure it up in my mind." Often this would be enough and the garments would be on sale in Wallis stores before the 'official' patterns arrived from Paris.

=== Further expansion ===
After steady growth the UK, the brand opened its first stores in Europe, some of which were concessions within department stores. By 1976, it was a PLC with 54 branches, including stores in Germany, Switzerland and Sweden. It later opened outlets in Saudi Arabia and South Africa under respective franchise and licensing agreements. In 1980, Wallis became a part of the Sears Group and in 1999, following the acquisition of Sears by Sir Philip Green, the brand was transferred to the Arcadia Group.

=== Sale ===
Amid the COVID-19 pandemic in the United Kingdom, as financial difficulties worsened, Arcadia entered administration on 30 November 2020, and all brands were put up for sale. In February 2021, Boohoo.com announced it was buying the Wallis, Dorothy Perkins and Burton brands for £25.2 million, with the loss of around 2450 jobs. The online website continues to trade, being managed by Boohoo.

== Operations ==
Wallis included dedicated ranges such as its Petite range and a premium range known as Limited Edition which was introduced in 2006. Wallis also worked closely with Cancer Research UK and launched a charity charm bracelet in 2005 and charm necklace in 2007 designed by international designers and celebrities such as Scarlett Johansson and Kate Moss to raise funds for the charity.

In September 2009, the supermodel Yasmin Le Bon partnered with Wallis to design her first women's clothing and jewellery collection called YLB. In 2010, the chain introduced a collection called 'Wallis 1923', featuring coats based on its early archive patterns.
