= Karen Millen =

British online women's clothing retailer

Karen Millen is a brand owned by Debenhams Group. The brand specialises in tailoring, coats and evening wear. It was acquired in 2019 following the collapse of Karen Millen Fashions Ltd, a company that operated a chain of clothing stores in many countries worldwide. The company was originally founded in 1981 by British entrepreneur fashion designer Karen Millen. She sold it in 2004 and was not subsequently involved in businesses bearing her name.

== Foundation and growth ==
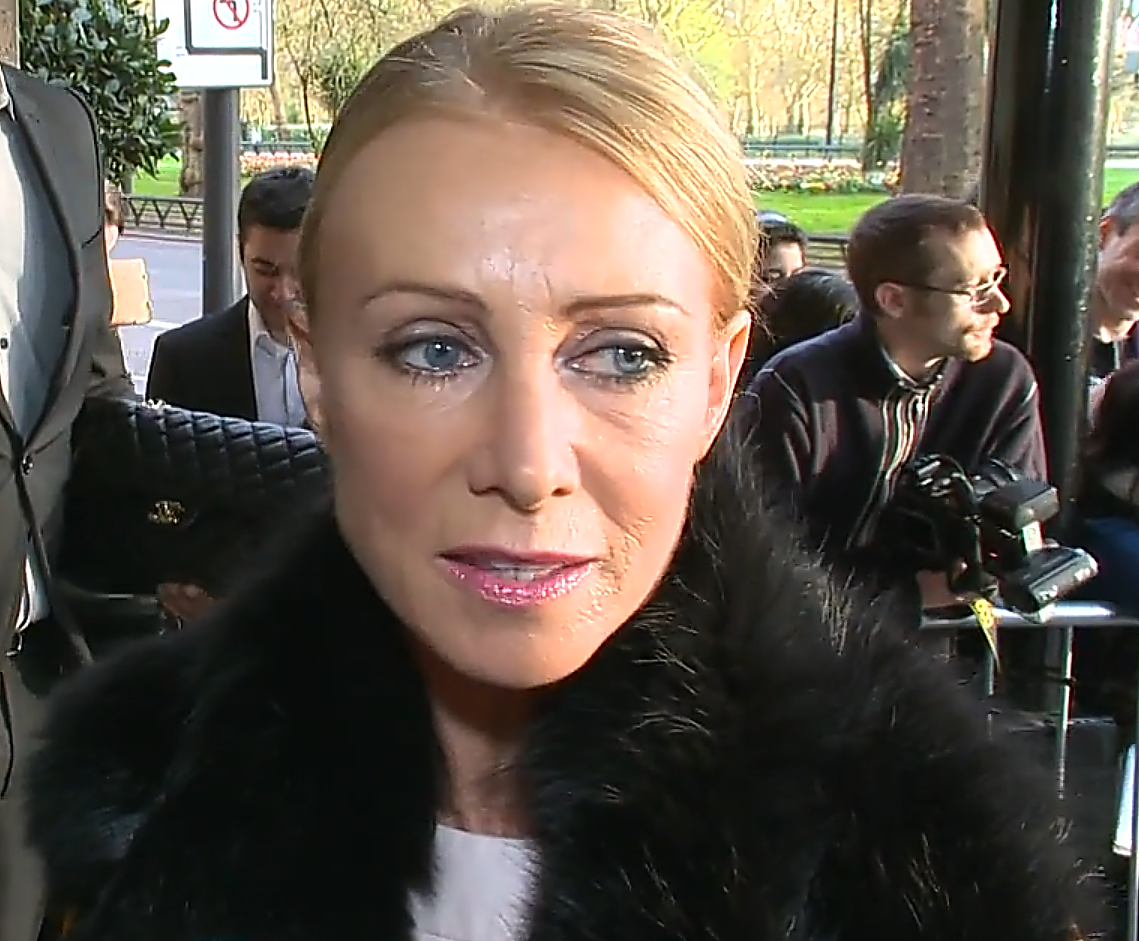
Designer Karen Millen at the 4th Asian Awards

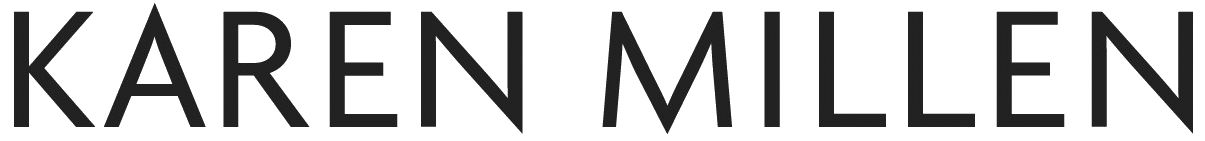
Karen Millen's former logo

English fashion designer Karen Millen (born September 29, 1961) studied fashion at the Medway College of Design, now known as University for the Creative Arts. She founded the Karen Millen company in 1981, partnered with Kevin Stanford. With a loan of £100, the pair bought one thousand metres of white cotton and began manufacturing and selling white shirts to their friends. A party-plan network followed, and in 1983, they opened their first store in Maidstone, Kent, which was followed a few years later by branches in Tunbridge Wells, Brighton, Guildford and London.

The company continued to expand throughout the 1990s, opening dozens of retail stores. In June 2004, the founder sold the business to Mosaic Fashions, a company from Iceland, had no further involvement in the Karen Millen company and under the terms of the sale was not permitted to use her name for other ventures.

== After departure of the founder ==
In 2009, Mosaic Fashions ceased trading, and the brand transferred to Aurora Fashions. The Karen Millen brand was spun-out from Aurora Fashions in 2011, remaining under the ownership of Aurora's owner, Kaupthing Bank.

In 2016, the Karen Millen company had 84 standalone stores and 46 concessions in the UK and Ireland. Internationally it had 16 company-owned stores and 57 franchise stores in 23 countries.

The Karen Millen business acquired the assets of its sister company, Coast, out of administration in October 2018. In August 2019, the two companies' online businesses were bought out of administration by internet retailer Boohoo for £18 million. Only the online employees were taken on by Boohoo and the standalone retail stores eventually closed.
