= Aurora Fashions =

Holding company of several retail fashion brands

- Industry: Fashion retail
- Predecessor: Mosaic Fashions
- Founded: 2009
- Defunct: 2015
- Headquarters: Iceland; UK
- Number of locations: 1250+
- Area served: International
- Products: Clothing
- Owner: Kaupthing Bank
- Website: www.aurorafashions.com

Aurora Fashions was a holding company of several retail fashion brands, formed in 2009 to purchase a number of businesses from the collapsed Mosaic Fashions. The company operated over 1,250 stores in 38 countries, including franchises, under the Oasis, Warehouse and Coast brands.

== History ==
In March 2011, the company announced plans to spin off Karen Millen, which was completed in 2012. Karen Millen was separated from the group to be owned by Aurora's parent Kaupthing Bank.

Aurora announced further plans in March 2013 for a wider restructuring. As part of this, Coast was also separated from the rest of the group, under the ownership of Kaupthing, and it was planned that Oasis and Warehouse would be merged under a new single parent company, Fresh Channel. The two brands were eventually de-merged as the Oasis and Warehouse Group, led by Liz Evans.

On 30 April 2020, it was announced that both Oasis and Warehouse went into administration with the loss of 1,800 jobs.
