= Debenhams Group =

Online fast-fashion retailer

Boohoo Group plc
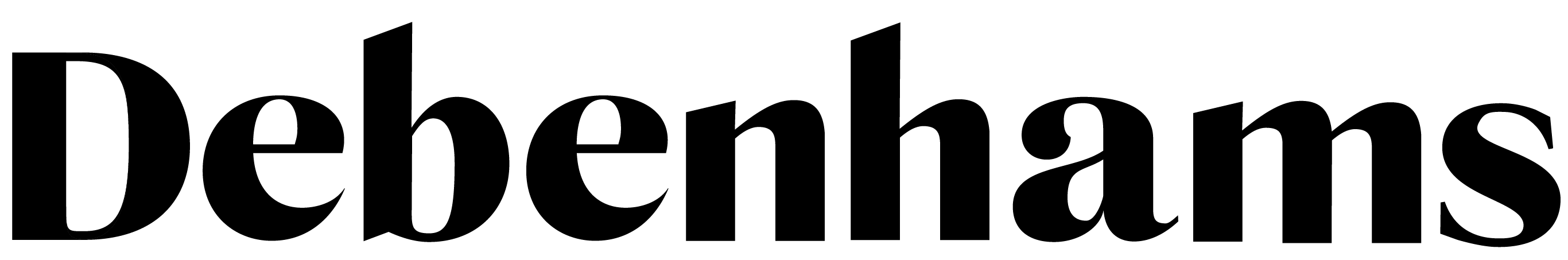
- Trade name: Debenhams Group
- Formerly: Boohoo.com plc
- Type: Public Limited Company
- Traded as: AIM: DEBS
- ISIN: JE00BG6L7297
- Industry: Fashion
- Founded: 2006
- Founders: Mahmud Kamani; Carol Kane
- Headquarters: Dale Street, Manchester, England
- Area served: Worldwide
- Key people: Mahmud Kamani; (Chairman); Dan Finley; (CEO)
- Products: Clothing
- Brands: Debenhams boohoo boohooMAN; PrettyLittleThing; Karen Millen
- Revenue: ▲£53.3 million (Adjusted EBITDA) (2026)
- Net income: ▼£-108.3 million (2026)
- Owner: Frasers Group (26.86%); Mahmud Kamani (11.46%); Camelot Capital Partners (8.34%)
- Number of employees: 1,500 (2026)
- Subsidiaries: Debenhams; PrettyLittleThing
- Website: debenhamsgroup.com

Boohoo Group plc (formerly Boohoo.com plc from 2013–2018), trading as Debenhams Group (also known as Debenhams; formerly trading as Boohoo Group until March 2025), is an online retail platform that operates five core brands, Debenhams, Karen Millen, boohoo, boohooMAN, and PrettyLittleThing, in fashion, beauty, and lifestyle retail.

The Group is named after the historic department store chain of the same name, some of whose assets were acquired by the then-named Boohoo in 2021.

Under the previous name Boohoo, the business faced controversy over working conditions at some of its third-party supplier factories, leading it to terminate contracts with multiple suppliers following investigations.

== History ==
Boohoo was founded in 2006 by Mahmud Kamani and Carol Kane, who are respectively group executive chairman and executive director, and who previously supplied high street chains such as Primark and New Look. The company completed its initial public offering (IPO) in March 2014, with its shares trading considerably above the 50p float price on the company's debut in the AIM sub-market of the London Stock Exchange. Valuing Boohoo at almost £600 million, the floatation saw Kamani net £135 million and Kane £25 million.

Boohoo has been criticised for promoting fast-fashion which comes at significant cost to the environment and people involved in the manufacturing process, including illegally low wages for workers sewing its garments in sweatshops abroad and in the UK. More than half of Boohoo's garments are produced in the UK, especially Leicester, London, and Manchester. As of 2020, Boohoo bought an estimated 75%–80% of the clothing produced in Leicester. This was made possible when other retailers such as ASOS reduced the amount they sourced from Leicester over concerns about working conditions. In 2017, the Channel 4 television documentary series Dispatches found that factories in Leicester supplying Boohoo (along with New Look, River Island and Missguided) were paying workers less than the national minimum wage. Boohoo stated that the work had been subcontracted without their knowledge.

In August 2019, the online businesses of Karen Millen and Coast were bought out of administration by Boohoo for £18 million. Only the online employees were taken on by Boohoo and the standalone retail stores eventually closed. Early in the COVID-19 pandemic, Boohoo reported an increase in sales. In June 2020, Boohoo announced that it was to acquire the brands and websites of high street chains Oasis Stores and Warehouse for £5.25 million.

Boohoo.com UK Limited
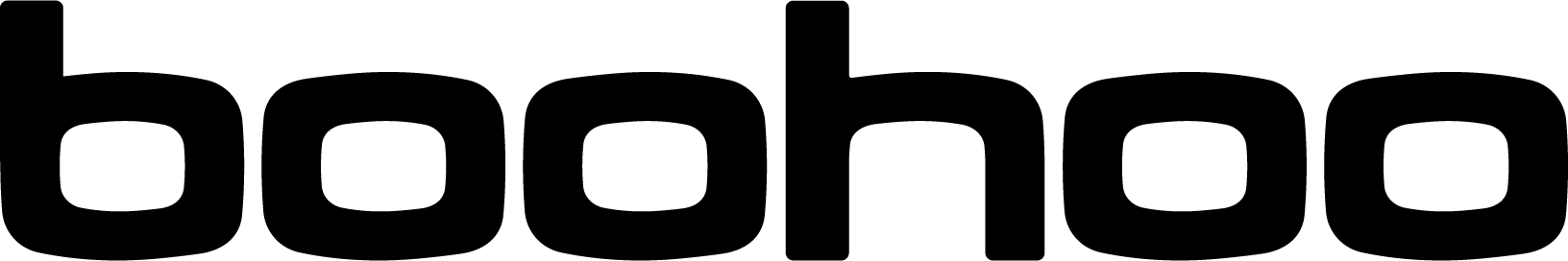
- Trade name: Boohoo
- Founded: 2006
- Headquarters: Dale Street, Manchester, England
- Parent: Debenhams Group
- Website: www.boohoo.com

In late June 2020, workers' rights group Labour Behind the Label produced a report that stated factories supplying Boohoo were not following to social distancing and forcing employees to work even if sick, claims that Boohoo denied. This was followed by an investigative report by The Sunday Times which claimed to have found that workers producing clothes for Boohoo at a Leicester-based company were paid £3.50 an hour, less than half the UK minimum wage for over 25s. Boohoo again distanced themselves from the company, a representative stating "We are taking immediate action to thoroughly investigate how our garments were in their hands, will ensure that our suppliers immediately cease working with this company, and we will urgently review our relationship with any suppliers who have sub-contracted work to the manufacturer in question." Standard Life Aberdeen, an asset manager and a top 10 shareholder in the group, announced that it had sold most of its stake in the company a few days after the Sunday Times revelations. SLA said that after engaging with Boohoo's management team a number of times during the week, it found the online retailer's response to the allegations was "inadequate in scope, timeliness and gravity". On 15 July 2020 a Conservative Party MP said that it was 'shameful' that it took a pandemic for Boohoo to finally be taken to task for its workplace practices. Philip Dunne, chairman of the Environmental Audit committee, also said that the company had not met a pledge to join the Ethical Trading Initiative organisation which brings together retailers, unions and campaign groups to improve practice in supply chains.

In September the company accepted the findings of a report by Allison Levitt QC, which found that the allegations of poor working practices in the company's supply chain were "substantially true", that its monitoring of the factories was "inadequate" due to “weak corporate governance”, and that its failure to assess the risk to workers during the coronavirus pandemic were "inexcusable". In November 2020 it appointed former judge Sir Brian Leveson to provide independent ethical oversight. An investigation by The Guardian newspaper in December 2020 traced Boohoo's supply chain to factories in Pakistan where workers claimed to be paid as low as £47 a month, less than the legal minimum wage, and ordered to work to shifts as long as 24 hours without receiving full overtime pay.

In January 2021, following the collapse of the UK department store chain Debenhams, Boohoo bought the brand and online business for £55 million. The deal did not include the firm's stores or workforce, leading to a predicted loss of 12,000 jobs. In February, Boohoo announced it was buying the former Arcadia Group brands: Burton, Wallis and Dorothy Perkins for £25.2 million, confirming the loss of around 2,450 jobs.

In December 2021, Boohoo has announced the expansion of operations into five new markets within the Asian region including Japan, Korea, Singapore, Hong Kong and Taiwan. In August 2022, Boohoo implemented a £1.99 charge for returning products.

An investigation by BBC Panorama in 2023 found that Boohoo pressured its suppliers into providing discounts after agreements had already been made and orders meant to be fulfilled by Boohoo's Thurmaston Lane factory were subcontracted out to Morocco.

In 2022, the company faced criticism for sexually suggestive ads.

In November 2024, Dan Finley was appointed Chief Executive Officer of Debenhams Group.

In December 2024, Boohoo shareholders blocked Mike Ashley and an associate from joining its board in a blow to his attempt to control the business.

In March 2025, Boohoo Group rebranded to Debenhams Group, the legal name remains Boohoo Group following Frasers Group's vote to block the legal name change. Brands that were not significant to the newly-named company were placed under the Debenhams subsidiary.

Following the rebrand to Debenhams Group, the business announced a new environmental, social and governance (ESG) strategy. This is underpinned by a number of ESG partnerships, including agreements with supply chain technology provider Segura, the Carbon Trust and micro-donation charity Pennies. In 2026, the company expanded its partnership with Pennies to additional brands within the Group after reporting more than £260,000 in customer micro-donations since the partnership began.

== Business operations ==
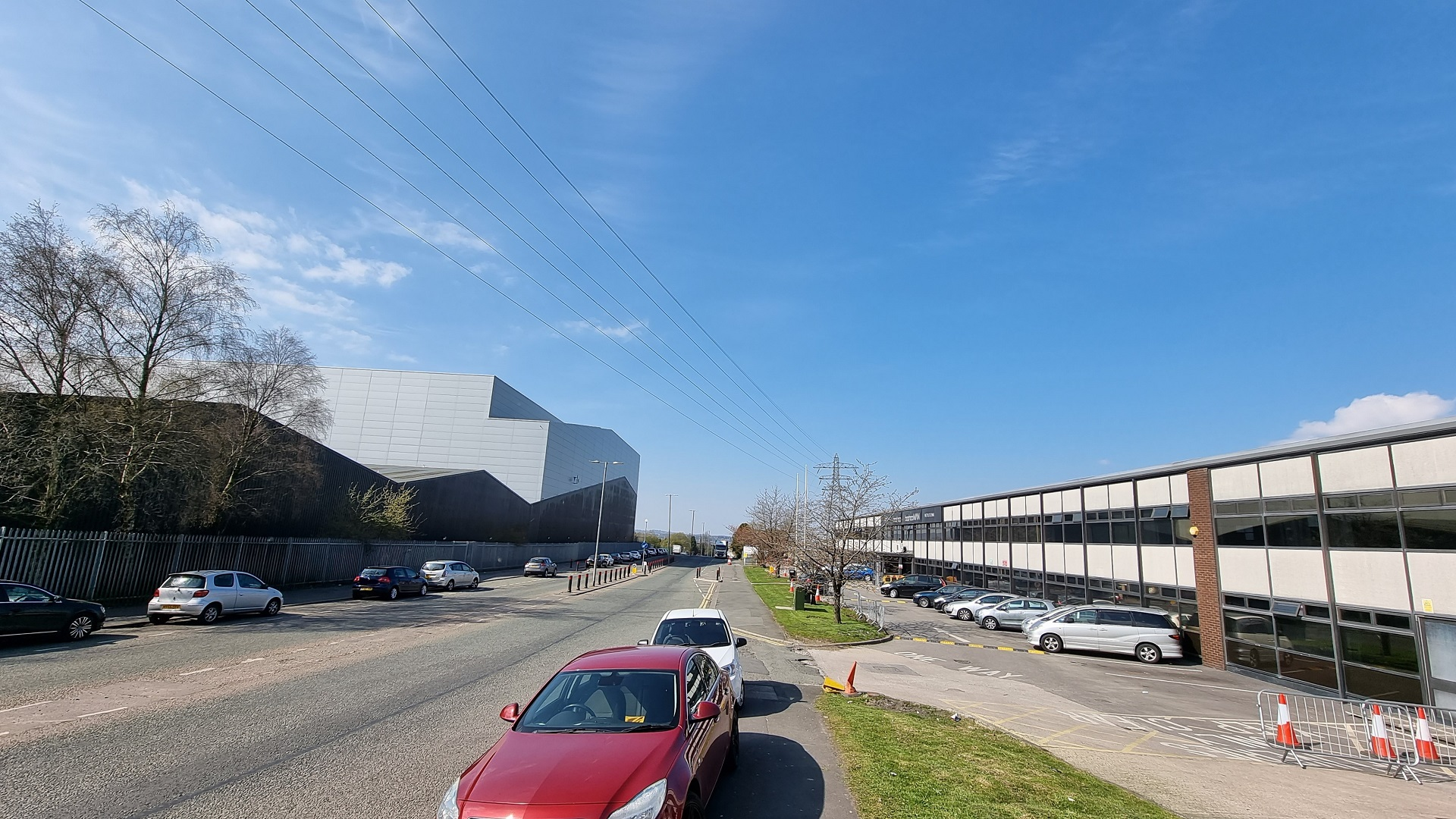
Western part of the distribution centre in Burnley

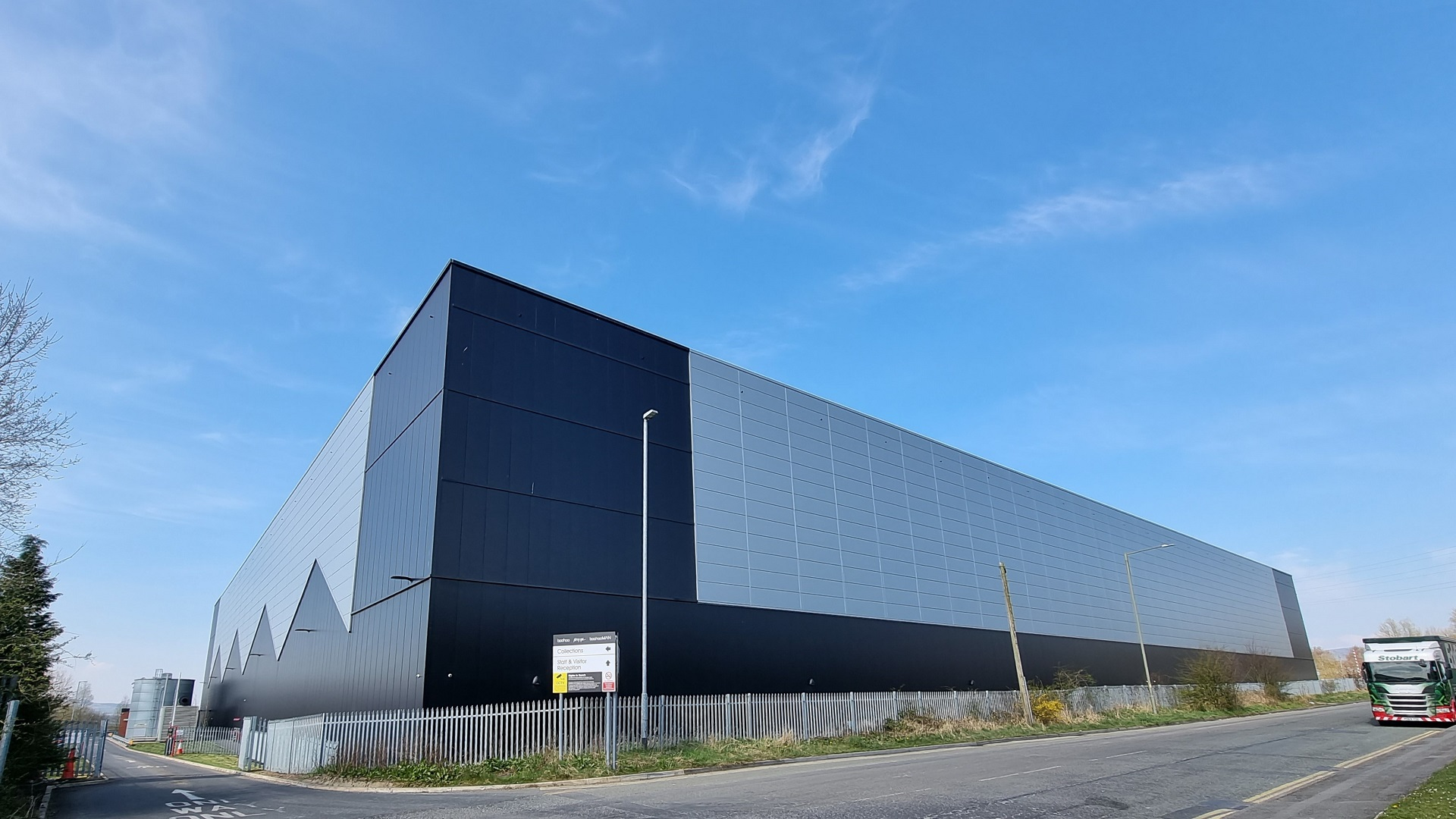
Eastern section of the distribution centre

Debenhams Group operates five core brands.

=== Debenhams ===
Debenhams as a retail brand dates back to 1778. The brand was acquired out of administration in 2021 by Boohoo Group, and is the largest brand in the Group. The turnaround of Debenhams is serving as the blueprint for other brands across the group.

=== Karen Millen ===
Established in 1918, Karen Millen is a British fashion brand with over four decades of design heritage.

=== Youth Brands (boohoo, boohooMAN, and PrettyLittleThing) ===
The Group's youth brands, boohoo, boohooMAN, and PrettyLittleThing (PLT), are global fashion brands, with more than 46m combined social media followers.

In June 2026, Debenhams Group and Revolution Beauty announced a new licensing partnership to develop beauty and fragrance products across Debenhams Group brands. The first collections are expected to launch ahead of Christmas 2026 and will include fragrance and gifting ranges for PrettyLittleThing, Karen Millen and boohooMAN.

=== Distribution centre ===
Between 2010 and 2025, the company's main distribution centre was located on the Heasandford Industrial Estate in Burnley, Lancashire.

Following a strategic review in August 2025, Debenhams Group announced it would close its Burnley distribution centre, with operations transferring to the company's facility in Sheffield. The closure was completed in early 2026.

=== Head office ===
In December 2024, Boohoo Group announced that it had sold its London head office to private real estate firm Global Holdings Group for £49.5 million. The sale is part of the company's broader efforts to "strengthen" its balance sheet, with part of the proceeds used to pay down a £47 million loan due for repayment in August 2025. The business’ headquarters are in Manchester.

=== International operations ===
In September 2025, Debenhams Group expanded into the United States by launching several of its brands, including Coast, Warehouse, Oasis, Nasty Gal and Karen Millen, on Macy's, Bloomingdale's and Nordstrom's websites.

=== Technology ===
The Group has sought to embed AI across all business functions. As of 2026, all brands across the Group have migrated onto a single proprietary AI-powered technology platform, supporting the rollout of marketplace models across the brands.

In late 2025, the Group partnered with Peak AI to deploy agentic AI software tools designed to optimise stock availability, demand forecasting, and automated markdown management ahead of high-volume seasonal trading cycles.

In February 2026, the Group partnered with PayPal, enabling customers to discover, receive personalised recommendations and check out entirely via AI within the PayPal app.

In May 2026, the Group became the first UK retailer to enable AI-driven in-app checkout on Meta, with US customers of Karen Millen, boohoo, boohooMAN, and PrettyLittleThing able to check out directly within Meta apps, including Facebook and Instagram.

== Corporate affairs ==
Following the turnaround of Debenhams after its acquisition in 2021, in March 2025 the company rebranded as Debenhams Group.

The business is rolling out the marketplace strategy developed for Debenhams across its other Group brands, boohoo, boohooMAN, PrettyLittleThing, and Karen Millen.

As of 2026, EBITDA is up 35% year-on-year, and the business has returned to growth.

=== Financial performance ===
In the 10 months to December 2013, Boohoo had sales totalling £92m, with a profit before charges of £10m. By February 2014, total sales had reached £110m, with profits of £11m.

Turnover in the year to February 2015 was £139.9m, an increase of 27% from the previous year, with an increase of gross profit by 31% to £85m.

In April 2017, Boohoo announced that its profits had almost doubled to £31 million on sales up 51% to almost £300 million. When the company was floated on the stock market in 2014, it was valued at £560m, and is worth about £2 billion as of April 2017. Internationally, the retailer suggests its 140% growth to revenue of almost £40m has exceeded expectation, whilst growth in Europe was 44% and 42% for the rest of their international operations.

Strong performance was reported in April 2018, when Boohoo announced almost double revenue from the previous year, up to £580 million, a pre-tax profit of £43.3 million and a 22 percent increase in customers. Boohoo has continued to experience strong performance with the last four-month period for 2019 experiencing a 44% jump in revenue to £328.2m.

In 2020, during the COVID-19 pandemic, Boohoo was reported to have turned a greater profit than in the previous fiscal year. Euronews Living reported at the time that "Boohoo has managed to capitalise on cosy clothing when its customers need comfort above all else." The company revealed a 45% increase in first quarter revenue.

In July 2020, the firm's share price fell 46% following allegations of malpractice at Leicester factories. In 2024, years after the BBC News investigation, the company was accused of only making surface level changes regarding worker conditions in its factories.

In the year ended 28 February 2026, the group delivered Adjusted EBITDA of £53.3 million, up 34.6% year-on-year (FY25: £39.6 million), with two profit upgrades through the year. Loss before tax narrowed by £243.9 million to £108.6 million (FY25: £352.5 million), driven by significantly lower exceptional costs, an improving underlying cost base and the full-year benefit of the Debenhams marketplace model. Group GMV was £1,820.7 million (FY25: £2,321.8 million), a decline of 21.6% year-on-year, with revenue of £917.0 million (FY25: £1,217.9 million), partly reflecting the continued mix shift toward the marketplace model, under which only commission income is recognised rather than the full transaction value.
