= Dorothy Perkins =

British women's fashion brand

- Logo used since 2006

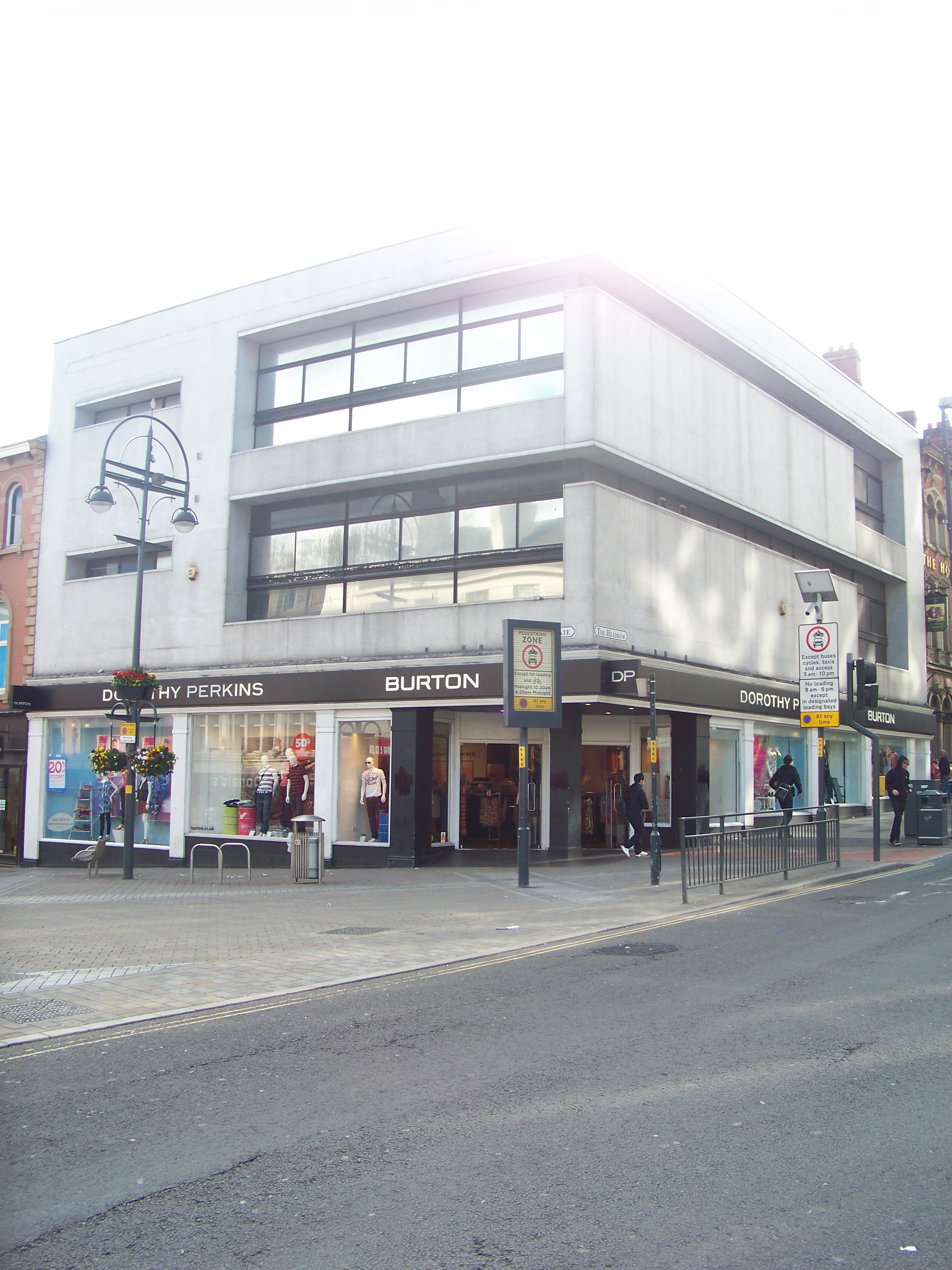
- A former Dorothy Perkins store shared with Burton on Briggate in Leeds (2011)
- Type: Private
- Industry: Fashion; Clothing; Textiles
- Founded: 1909
- Defunct: 2021 (Stores)
- Fate: Converted into an online store
- Headquarters: London, United Kingdom
- Area served: United Kingdom
- Products: Women's retail fashion
- Owner: Debenhams Group
- Parent: Debenhams
- Website: dorothyperkins.com

Dorothy Perkins is a British online women's fashion retailer operated by Debenhams Group in the United Kingdom. Formerly a store chain, it sold both its own range of clothes and branded fashion goods until February 2021, when it became part of Boohoo Group (now known as Debenhams Group), having been acquired after the collapse of Philip Green's fashion empire Arcadia Group.

== History ==
Founded in 1909 under the name H. P. Newman, the company changed its trading name to Dorothy Perkins in 1919. In the 1960s, Dorothy Perkins was controlled by the Farmer family, who used to own Winster Hosiery. Staff in the branches could expect regular visits from Alan Farmer, whose picture was printed in a booklet handed to new employees. He established Dorothy Perkins by offering low prices for women's clothing. Best known for its lingerie, tights, and sleepwear collections, its other clothes had difficulty competing with the more trendy Lewis Separates, now owned by River Island Clothing Company Ltd, and Peter Robinson.

In the late 1960s, Dorothy Perkins co-funded Biba's expansion into a large boutique on Kensington High Street. From 1970 to 1973 it owned a 70% stake in the business allowing Biba to extend from womenswear into accessories, beauty products, menswear, children's clothing and home goods.

The Burton Group, later known as Arcadia, purchased Dorothy Perkins in 1979.

The Arcadia Group had a training programme, which offered financial incentives to employees to expand their responsibilities and knowledge of company and business affairs.

In 1994, Dorothy Perkins recruited celebrity Helena Christensen as the face of the brand. Yasmin Le Bon later joined Christensen as a face of Dorothy Perkins. In 2012, Khloe, Kourteney and Kim Kardashian launched the Kardashian Kollection with the fashion chain.

In July 2020, Arcadia Group, which comprised several brands including the Topshop and Dorothy Perkins fashion chains, had been hit hard by the COVID-19 lockdown and planned 100s of job cuts to minimise costs. As financial difficulties worsened, Arcadia entered administration on 30 November 2020. In February 2021, Boohoo.com announced it was buying the Dorothy Perkins brand from Arcadia (along with the Wallis and Burton brands) for £25.2 million, with the loss of around 2,450 jobs. The website is still trading, managed by Boohoo.
