= Josh Heird =

American college sports administrator

Current position
- Title: Athletic director
- Team: Louisville
- Conference: ACC

Biographical details
- Born: U.S.
- Education: Mississippi College; University of Louisville

Josh Heird is an American college athletics administrator. He is the Director of Athletics for the Louisville Cardinals athletics program at the University of Louisville.

Heird was promoted to interim athletic director by the university in 2021 following the resignation of Vince Tyra. In 2022 after six months as interim AD, Heird was named the permanent athletic director. He is the university's twelfth athletic director. In December 2024, Heird signed an extension on his contract which will keep him at Louisville until 2030.

== Education ==
Heird received his bachelor's from Mississippi College, where he competed on the cross country, track and field, and football teams for the Choctaws. He received his Master of Business Administration from the University of Louisville in 2009.

== Career ==
Heird began his administrative career in 2007 at Louisville. His first stint at Louisville would come under then athletic director Tom Jurich. He served as the Assistant Athletic Director for Championships and Facilities from 2012 to 2016 before leaving to work for the Villanova Wildcats.

Heird returned to Louisville in April 2019 to work as the Deputy Athletic Director under Vince Tyra.

In December 2021, following the resignation of Tyra, Heird was promoted to interim athletic director. During his six months in this position, Heird would oversee the departure of then Louisville basketball head coach Chris Mack and the hiring of his replacement, Kenny Payne. In the spring of 2022, women's basketball head coach Jeff Walz and volleyball head coach Dani Busboom Kelly would be extended.

In June 2022, after six months serving as the interim AD, Heird was hired as the permanent athletic director. In his first two years as the full-time AD, Heird handled head coaching changes in both the football and basketball programs. Following the departure of Scott Satterfield in December 2022, Jeff Brohm was hired as the head coach of the football program. In March 2024, after an abysmal 12–25 start, head coach Kenny Payne was fired. Pat Kelsey was hired from Charleston.

In December 2024, the University of Louisville extended Josh Heird through 2030.
