= Maurice Bidermann =

French industrialist (1932–2020)

- Born: Maurice Zylberberg; 4 April 1932; Anderlecht, Belgium
- Died: 30 March 2020 (aged 87); Paris, France
- Occupation: Businessman
- Known for: CEO of Bidermann SA
- Spouse: Danièle Bibas
- Children: Camille Bidermann, Julia Bidermann
- Family: Joshua Roizen, Ezra Roizen, and Samuel Roizen

Maurice Bidermann, birth name Maurice Zylberberg, (4 April 1932 – 30 March 2020) was a Belgian industrialist in the textile business, descended from Polish Jews.

He was a Knight of the French National Order of Merit in 1991.

== Life and career ==
Bidermann was born in Anderlecht, Belgium, the son of Tauba (Rodstein) and Joseph Zylberberg, a restaurateur. His parents were from Poland. Being Jewish, he lived along with his sister Evelyne from 1941 to 1943 with a Christian family in Aix-en-Provence; while his sister Regina was hidden in a convent. In 1943, the German police detained him and he was sent to a clinic in Bandol due to health problems. In 1946, Maurice Zylberberg arrived in Paris. In 1948 he left Paris and voyaged to Israel and joined the Israel Defense Forces for 18 months but returned to France to work in a food factory. In April 1950, he entered the business of textiles and clothing of his uncle George Bidermann. Bidermann quickly introduced new technical manufacturing processes and personnel management revolutionizing the textile industry. These innovations allowed the company Bidermann to reach a production level unrivalled in Europe, paving the way for export. In 1966 he signed an agreement with the Soviet Union on 310,000 menswear. In France, the Bidermann group then had the licensing models menswear brands Yves Saint Laurent, Daniel Hechter, Daniel Cremieux and André Courrèges. In the United States, the Bidermann Group acquired the brands licenses for Calvin Klein sportswear men, and Ralph Lauren women's wear. The family business that employed 60 people in 1950 became twenty-five years later an industry group of some thirty factories employing about 18,000 people across the world (12,000 foreign and 6,000 in Europe).

The Iraq War and new competition disrupted the growth of Bidermann Group experiencing difficulties that required it to restructure its production, both French and American. Maurice Bidermann preferred to save jobs and tried to revive the group through acquisitions in the 1990s including the firm's brands Burberry, Arrow and Gold Toe licenses. However, in 1995 Maurice Bidermann was forced to cede part of his French group to the Deveaux Group.

=== Elf Case ===
Bidermann was sentenced to three years in prison, two suspended and fined one million euros for the leaders of "abuse of corporate assets, the misuse of corporate assets to expense Elf, presenting false accounts "and" spreading false information "on the consolidated statements of Bidermann group" in 1992.

== Philanthropy ==
Maurice Bidermann contributed to the development of the spirit of cooperation between the Israeli and Palestinian peoples such as supporting NGOs like Action against Hunger. He supported the Museum of Warsaw in Poland, the country of origin of his parents. In 1974 he created the Association of French Friends of university AFBGU (Ben-Gurion University of the Negev), the development of a program between Jewish and Muslim students at the University of Haifa, development and training of mediators and a training school for teachers at the University of Tel Aviv, the creation of the Lycée Franco-Israeli Raymond Leven in Tel Aviv or the granting of micro-credits for projects involving Israelis and Palestinians.

== Personal life ==
Maurice Bidermann was married to Danièle Bibas, born 11 December 1940, in Casablanca, Morocco. They had two daughters.

He died on March 30, 2020, at the age of 87, from COVID-19 during the COVID-19 pandemic in France.
