= Eveleth Recreation Building =

- U.S. National Register of Historic Places
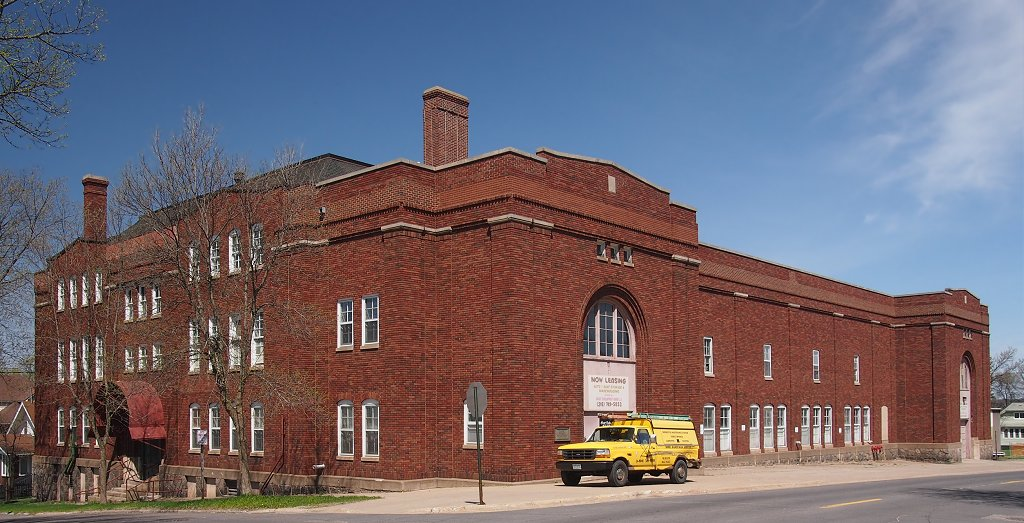
- The Eveleth Recreation Building from the southeast

- Location within Minnesota Location within the United States
- Location: Garfield Street and Adams Avenue, Eveleth, Minnesota
- Coordinates: 47°27′59″N 92°32′20″W
- Area: Less than one acre
- Built: 1918
- NRHP reference No.: 80004344
- Added to NRHP: November 25, 1980

The Eveleth Recreation Building, later the Arrow Shirt Factory, is a historic building in Eveleth, Minnesota, United States. It was constructed in 1918 as a municipal gymnasium, with a curling rink on the ground floor and an ice hockey rink on the second floor. At that time the city of Eveleth was flush with tax revenue from the Mesabi Range mining boom, and the population was heavily male from the influx of mine workers. As the gender balance evened out in the 1930s, the building was converted into a garment factory, answering a need for employment opportunities for women and diversifying the local economy.

Floor Plans
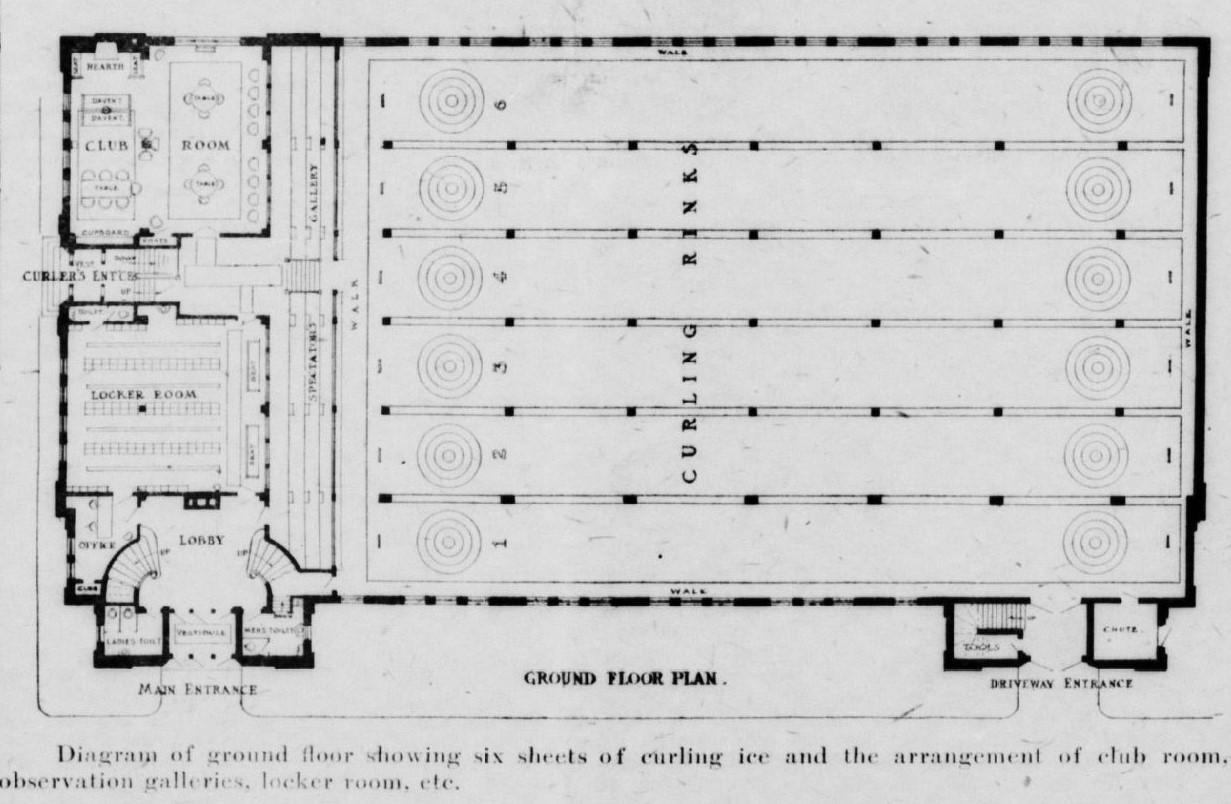
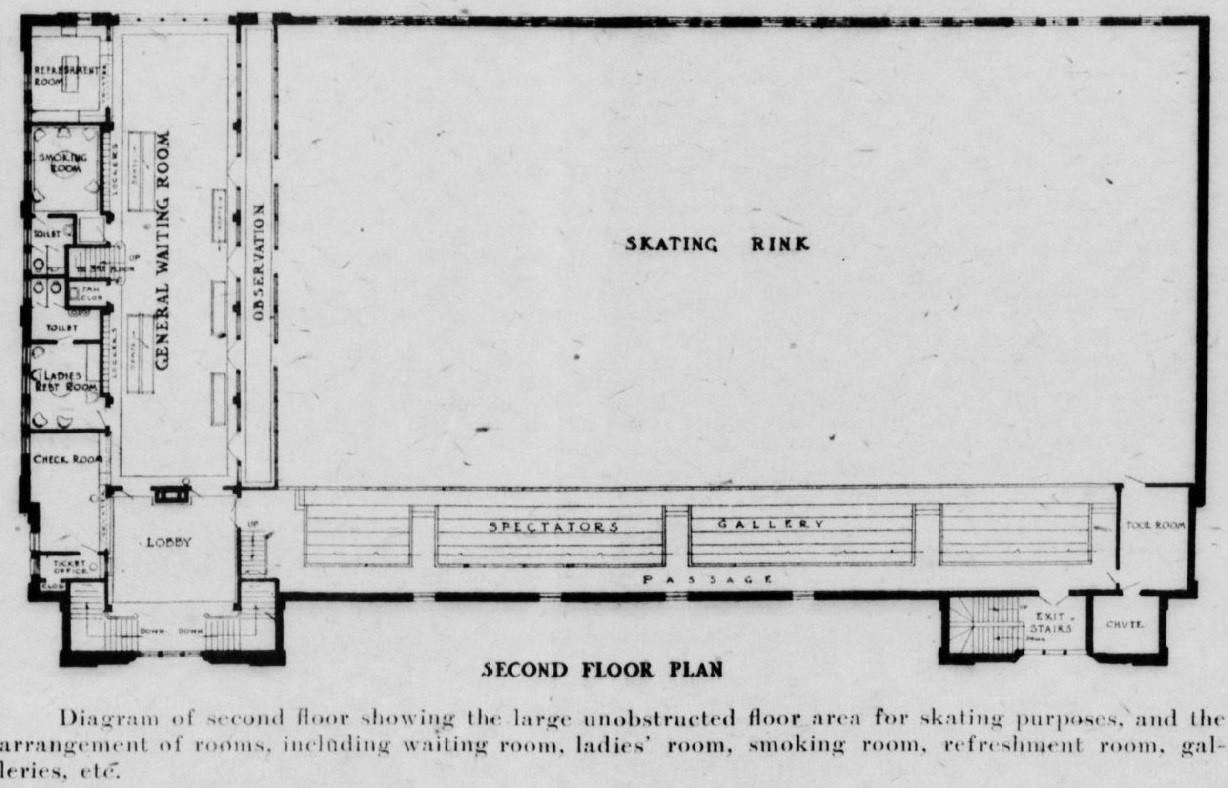
Left: Curling, 1st floor; Right: Rink, 2nd floor

The Eveleth Recreation Building was the first modern facility of its type on the Mesabi Range. Eveleth quickly earned a national reputation for its hockey players and teams, including the United States Amateur Hockey Association's Eveleth Reds. In warmer months the recreation building hosted roller skating and public dances. The city constructed a new hockey facility in 1922, and ten years later the Recreation Building was retired as a skating venue. After World War II, Cluett Peabody & Company remodeled the building as a factory for its Arrow brand shirts and underwear. Arrow production ceased locally in 1978 and the next long-term tenant was a furniture manufacturer. As of 2019 the building is being operated as a storage facility for cars and boats.

The building was listed on the National Register of Historic Places in 1980 for its state-level significance in the themes of industry and social history. It was nominated for representing the public support for recreational facilities during the Progressive Era and the later evolution of the Iron Range's economy and population.

== See also ==
- National Register of Historic Places listings in St. Louis County, Minnesota
