= Sock Shop =

British clothing retailer

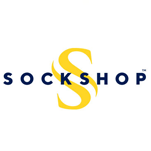
- Industry: Retail Specialist
- Founded: 1983; 43 years ago
- Headquarters: Bolton, Greater Manchester, United Kingdom
- Products: Socks; Hosiery; Tights; Underwear; Accessories
- Parent: Ruia Group

SOCKSHOP is a British-based specialist retailer of socks and hosiery. Founded in 1983 by Sophie Mirman and Richard P. Ross, SOCKSHOP became part of the Ruia Group in 2006, and is now based mainly online, with stores in the Manchester Arndale and The Lowry Outlet, as well as concessions across the United Kingdom.

== Business history ==
=== Founding ===
SOCKSHOP was founded by husband-and-wife team Sophie Mirman (daughter of milliner Simone Mirman) and Richard P. Ross, a former colleague of Mirman's at speciality retailer Tie Rack; both Ross and Mirman had acted as retail directors before leaving to launch SOCKSHOP. Mirman envisioned a range of small shops selling only women's tights, stockings and socks, with the aim of customers being able to purchase socks and hosiery "as easily as they buy newspapers". Mirman, through her experience as a junior secretary at Marks & Spencer and then later through its management training programme, had identified a need to buy stylish hosiery without having to hunt through large department stores to find it, which at the time dominated the British hosiery market. With the assistance of a Government loan guarantee programme for capital-short entrepreneurs, Mirman and Ross launched SockShop in 1983.

SOCKSHOP outlets were purchased, many placed for their convenience on busy city streets, in train stations, subway stations and airport, and for their small size, with most having a floor space of between 400–12,000 square feet (37–1,115 m^{2}) and no visible doors. Their stock featured bold colours, dramatic patterns and novelty designs in hundreds of styles. Prices were considered moderate at £0.99 to £24.99 per pair in 1987, with the priciest designs including gold-lace tights.

=== Early years ===
The first SockShop store was opened on the concourse of the Knightsbridge tube station. Though the business' original ambitions were modest, exceeding no more than four or six retail outlets, by 1987, there were 52 stores in the SOCKSHOP chain, with the business having become one of the fastest-growing speciality retailing businesses in Europe. Mirman had become the 188th richest person in Britain, and its youngest millionaire.

In November 1987, SockShop (recently renamed as a company to Sock Shop International P.L.C) opened three stores in Manhattan, aiming (as in London) towards walk-by traffic. One of these outlets was at the 42nd Street entrance to Grand Central Station, the same principle as behind the first British store's placement.

=== Administration to present day ===
A couple of years later, when recession struck, Mirman and Ross discovered that their equity (worth £50 million in 1988) had become valueless, and were overwhelmed by debts. In 1990, the business entered administration and BDO Binder Hamlyn took over. 58 shops, including 17 outlets in the United States (14 in New York City alone) were closed down, and discussions were entered with interested parties to try to get new funding capital for financing expansion in Europe. Despite the closures, administrators recommended Mirman to be retained in a key role, praising her business acumen.

In August 1990, the business, 85 shops, and the French subsidiary were purchased for £3.25 million (plus an injection of £3.75 million working capital) by a consortium backed by Scottish fund manager Murray Johnstone. The company was renamed SockShop Holdings. Unsecured creditors and shareholders in SockShop International received no money from the sale. The chairman for Murray Johnstone Developments, Fred Dalgarno, blamed the expense of the US operation and over-expansion for Sock Shop's problems. Having shed the burden of their debts, it was planned that SockShop Holdings be expanded more cautiously.

SockShop Holdings fell back into the administrator's hands a second time after becoming part of the Facia Group, a retail conglomerate of 850 shops and 80,000 employees that collapsed in 1996 with debts of £70m due to the fraudulent actions of its owner, Stephen Hinchliffe. It was subsequently acquired by the Tulchan Group.

In 2003, SockShop (by then reduced to 13 stores across the UK) was bought for £3.9 million by the Birmingham-based firm of Harris Watson Holdings. The firm collapsed a third time in 2006. The administrators, Poppleton & Appleby, were brought in on 25 January 2006 to try and salvage the dramatically reduced company. This third collapse was attributed to substantial losses as a result of a slowdown in consumer spending and a rise in running costs. In February 2006, following administration, it was bought by Osan Ltd which is a subsidiary of Ruia Group.

== Online shop ==
Following the 2006 purchase, SOCKSHOP became primarily an internet retailer, and is based at Dove Mill in Bolton. The online store, www.sockshop.co.uk, houses SOCKSHOP's largest collection, including socks, tights, hosiery, underwear and accessories from more than 90 brands – among them Falke, Pantherella, Calvin Klein, Sloggi, Happy Socks and Stance, as well as several of their own brands, including Pringle, ELLE, Heat Holders, Glenmuir, Jeep, Workforce and Wild Feet. SOCKSHOP.co.uk boasts a wide and growing range of bamboo products, including socks and underwear.

== Physical stores ==
SOCKSHOP has two main stores, as well as a number of concessions across the UK.

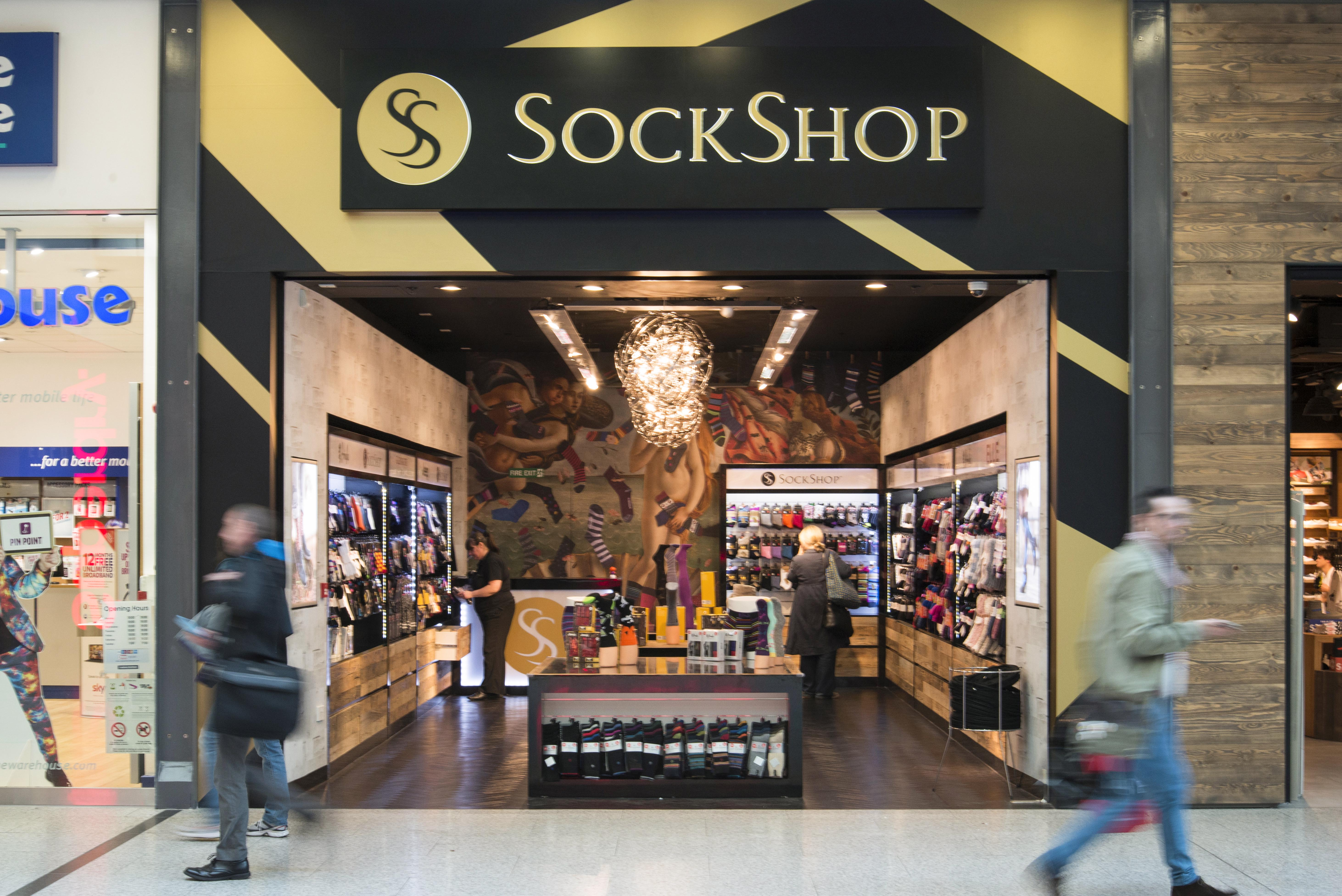
SOCKSHOP's store in the Manchester Arndale shopping centre

=== The Lowry Outlet ===
SOCKSHOP opened a store in The Lowry Outlet in 2014, selling a selection of socks from the company's own brands, as well as items from other companies within the Ruia Group.

=== Manchester Arndale ===
In 2015, SOCKSHOP opened a store in the Manchester Arndale shopping centre in Manchester city centre. Located on the ground floor of the centre, the store sells a range of products from SOCKSHOP's own brands.

== Charity work ==
=== Socks for a Cause ===
In 2018, SOCKSHOP launched its Socks For A Cause campaign, donating 20,000 pairs of socks to various homelessness charities in an effort to combat the growing problem of trenchfoot amongst homeless people, and to help tackle the homelessness problem in Greater Manchester. SOCKSHOP continues to donate socks, underwear and accessories to homeless charities across the country.

=== Pride socks ===
SOCKSHOP designed and launched a range of Pride socks in 2017, donating 20% from the sale of each pair sold to the LGBT Foundation, a Manchester-based charity which provides help and support for members of the LGBT+ community.

== See also ==
- List of sock manufacturers
