= Cluett Peabody & Company =

American apparel manufacturer

- Cluett, Peabody & Company, Inc.
- U.S. National Register of Historic Places
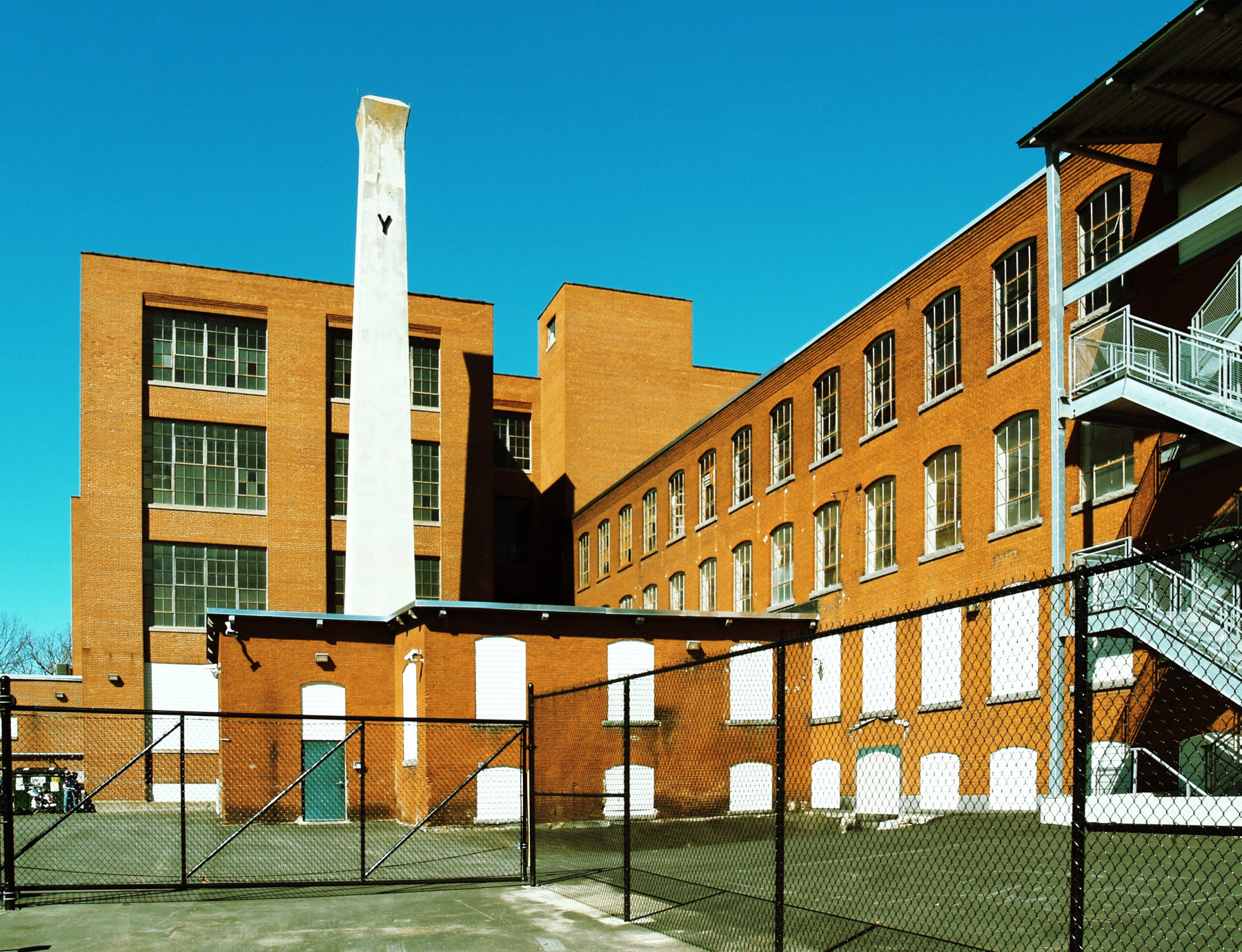

- Location within Massachusetts Location within the United States
- Location: Leominster, Massachusetts
- Coordinates: 42°31′34″N 71°45′11″W
- Built: 1902
- Architectural style: Colonial Revival
- NRHP reference No.: 89000439
- Added to NRHP: June 8, 1989

Cluett, Peabody & Company, Inc. once headquartered in Troy, New York, was a longtime manufacturer of shirts, detachable shirt cuffs and collars, and related apparel. It is best known for its Arrow brand collars and shirts and the related Arrow Collar Man advertisements (1907–1931). It dates, with a different name, from the mid-19th century and was absorbed by WestPoint Pepperell in the 1980s. The Arrow name is still licensed to brand men's shirts and ties.

The company manufactured shirts and collars in a historic building at 123 First Street in Leominster, Massachusetts. The building was constructed in 1902 and added to the National Register of Historic Places in 1989.

== History ==
In 1851, Maullin & Blanchard, manufacturers of collars, began operations at 282 River Street in Troy, NY. This company was succeeded in 1856 by Maullin & Bigelow, and in 1861 by Maullin, Bigelow, & Co., when Mr. George B. Cluett, a clerk in the company since 1854, became a partner. Upon the dissolution of the partnership in 1862, Joseph Maullin and George B. Cluett formed the firm Maullin & Cluett. On the death of Mr. Maullin in 1863, the firm Geo. B. Cluett, Bros., & Co. was formed.

In 1891, Geo. B. Cluett, Bros., & Co merged with Coon & Co., also of Troy, NY, to form Cluett, Coon & Co., bringing Frederick F. Peabody into the firm. The Cluett, Coon & Co soon became the Cluett, Peabody & Co. in 1899.

Prior to 1919, the principal business for Cluett, Peabody & Co. was manufacturing men's shirt collars. Beginning in the 1920s the demand for collar-attached shirts grew considerably, while the detached collar business experienced a decline. In 1929 Cluett, Peabody & Co. established a national menswear business under the Arrow brand name. The "Arrow" name gradually grew into a product line that included shirts, collars, handkerchiefs, cravats, pajamas, and underwear for men and boys.

By 1935 Cluett Peabody operated eleven plants, mostly in the Northeast, including a plant at 123 First Street in Leominster, MA. In 1945 sales for Cluett Peabody were $31.3 million, and by 1955 sales had nearly tripled, to $87.4 million. At their heyday, the owned plants numbered 13 with an additional two in a wholly owned subsidiary and the weekly production approximated 67,700 dozen. In addition in the mid 70's the company arranged production from contractors of an additional weekly 31,000 dz. for a total 98,700 dozen. At this time additional shirt production lines were being contracted from Korea.

In 1985, Cluett Peabody rejected a takeover offer from Paul Bilzerian and his partner, writing "management and the entire board of directors have absolutely no interest in pursuing your proposal." Later that year, Cluett, Peabody & Co. accepted a competing offer, and was acquired by WestPoint Pepperell, Inc.

Bidermann Industries purchased Cluett, Peabody & Co. from WestPoint Pepperell in 1990. Cluett American Group (Vestar Capital Partners) bought the company in 1998. In 2004, Phillips-Van Heusen Corporation (parent company of longtime archrival Van Heusen) acquired the Arrow brand and the related licensing business from Cluett American Group for approximately $70 million. The remaining elements of the Cluett American Group now operate as Gold Toe Brands (GTB Holding Corp). GTB Holding Corp still holds the trademark licensing rights to the Sanforization process of pre-shrinking fabric, named for its inventor, Sanford L. Cluett, who developed the process for Cluett, Peabody & Co, which he joined in 1919. On August 2, 2021 the Arrow, Van Heusen, Izod, and Geoffrey Beene brands were sold to Authentic Brands Group (ABG). Under ABG, United Legwear & Apparel Co. was named as the licensee for the Arrow brand.

== See also ==
- National Register of Historic Places listings in Worcester County, Massachusetts
