= Cabot Hosiery Mills =

United States textile manufacturing company

Coordinates: 44°9′33″N 72°39′0″W

- Industry: Textile manufacturing
- Headquarters: Northfield, Vermont, U.S.
- Key people: Ric Cabot, President/C.E.O.
- Products: Socks
- Brands: Darn Tough
- Revenue: US$50,000,000 (2016)
- Number of employees: 200 (2016)
- Website: darntough.com

Cabot Hosiery Mills is a textile manufacturer located in Northfield, Vermont, that makes socks under the "Darn Tough" and "Wide Open" brand labels. First established in 1978, the company began manufacturing its "Darn Tough" socks in 2004.

== History ==
The company was founded in 1978 by Marc Cabot, who had worked in the textile industry in New York until he purchased and rebuilt a vacant mill in Northfield. His son Ric Cabot joined the company in 1989. Through the 1990s, Cabot Hosiery primarily manufactured socks for retail chains such as The Gap, which relabeled the product for sale under their own house brand names. As retailers began looking to foreign manufacturers able to offer a lower price, Cabot Hosiery's sales declined from $7 million to $5 million annually, leading the company to lay off about 40 workers. By the early 2000s, the company owed several million dollars to its creditors, had defaulted on loans and was late on tax bills.

In 2004, Ric Cabot devised the strategy of selling socks designed for durability under an in-house name, leading to the launch of the "Darn Tough" brand. That year, both Cabots invested additional personal equity into the business prior to the new brand's public launch. The socks were initially distributed locally, but high demand, particularly among outdoor enthusiasts, led the company to reach distribution deals with national retailers, including REI and L.L.Bean. The company also sold socks to the US military, which is required by law to purchase supplies from domestic producers, with sales to the armed forces making up as much as a third of all revenue. Driven by the "Darn Tough" brand, Cabot Hosiery's sales rose through the 2000s, and by 2012 the mill employed about 130 people. During the first half of the 2010s, sales continued to rise by about 60% annually, and in 2015, with Ric Cabot by then having taken over the role of president and CEO from his father, the company announced a 100,000 ft^{2} (9,300 m^{2}) expansion of its factory. As of 2016, annual sales for Cabot Hosiery were just under $50 million, and the company employed about 200 people, with plans to hire more as expansion continued.

== See also ==
- List of sock manufacturers
