= Glenmuir =

Scottish knitwear and clothing company

Glenmuir is a golf knitwear and clothing company founded in 1891 in Lanark, Scotland. For the past 25 years it has been the preferred supplier of shirts and knitwear to the European Ryder Cup Team.

== History ==
In 1891, local businessman Andrew MacDougall established a hosiery factory in the small village of Kirkfieldbank near Lanark, in the Clyde Valley. MacDougall’s first work force initially consisted of five women, all named Mary. MacDougall was the inventor of a new power-driven machine that greatly simplified the design and manufacture of fancy golf hose.

Before 1900, the company moved to a new factory in Lanark, and the premises were extended to accommodate the growing business. From its beginnings as a hosiery and knitwear factory, the company’s Lanark site has developed over the years to provide a club, corporate, and event embroidery programme.

The Ruia Group acquired Glenmuir in 2002. The Ruia Group, owners of Sock Shop is a family run textile business based in Lancashire. In November 2009, an agreement between Glenmuir and Sunderland of Scotland meant Glenmuir became the official European distributor of Sunderland of Scotland golf products.

== Associations ==
Ryder Cup

Glenmuir's association with the Ryder Cup began in 1987, when Tony Jacklin captained the first-ever European Team to lift the trophy on ‘foreign soil’ at Muirfield Village, USA. The partnership between Glenmuir and the European Ryder Cup committee has been one of the longest-running in the world of high-profile professional sport, with Glenmuir the preferred supplier of shirts and knitwear from 1987 to 2014.

Professional Golfers' Association

Glenmuir is the longest-running sponsor of the Glenmuir PGA Professional Championship, the largest annual competition for registered PGA Professionals.

Glenmuir is a Corporate Partner of the PGAs of Europe and in 2011 was the preferred supplier to both teams in the Vivendi Seve Trophy.
