= Swiss Barefoot Company =

Socks manufacturer company

The Swiss Barefoot Company is a sock manufacturer based in Switzerland.

== Products ==
Swiss Protection Sock (SPS); a toe sock made of kevlar with tiny rubber dots on the bottom designed to be worn as a minimalist shoe and offer more protection than an ordinary sock. It comes in standard and low-cut versions.

Free Your Feet (FYF) Sock; a development of the Swiss Protection Sock made of Dyneema. The company claims that this is "the most minimalist footwear ever".

== See also ==
- List of sock manufacturers
