= Gildan =

Canadian clothing company

Gildan Activewear Inc.
- Type: Public
- Traded as: TSX: GIL; NYSE: GIL; S&P/TSX 60 component
- Industry: Textile, clothing
- Founded: 1984; 42 years ago
- Founders: Glenn Chamandy; Greg Chamandy
- Headquarters: KPMG Tower, Montreal, QC, Canada
- Key people: Glenn Chamandy (CEO); Rhodri J. Harries (CFO)
- Revenue: ▲US$3.27 billion (2024)
- Operating income: ▼US$618 million (2024)
- Net income: ▼US$401 million (2024)
- Total assets: ▲US$3.72 billion (2024)
- Total equity: ▼US$1.46 billion (2024)
- Number of employees: 50,000 (2024)
- Subsidiaries: American Apparel; Hanesbrands
- Website: www.gildan.com

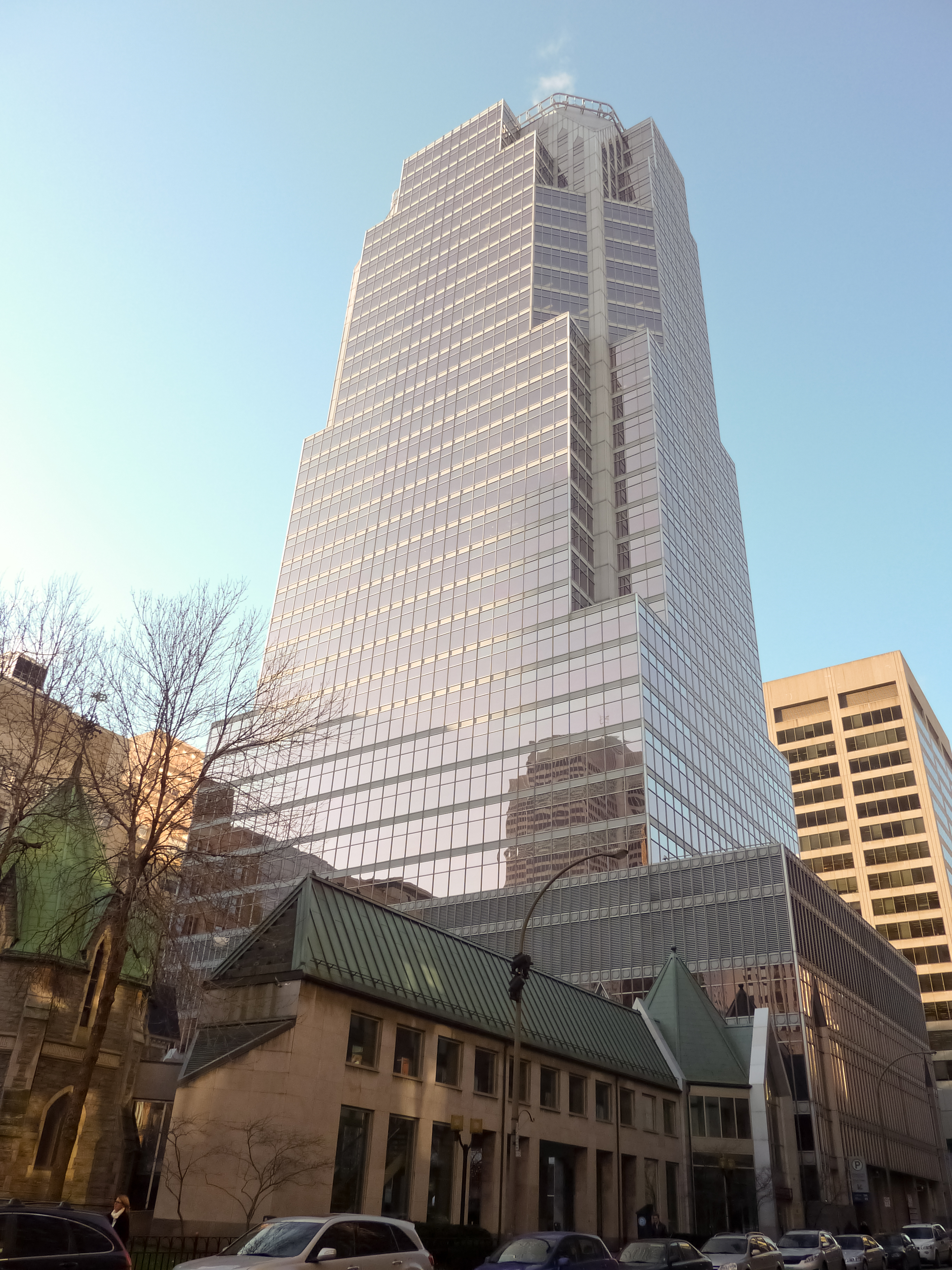
KPMG Tower, the headquarters of Gildan

Gildan Activewear Inc. (pronounced [/ˈɡɪldən/], French: Les Vêtements de Sport Gildan Inc.) is a Canadian manufacturer of branded clothing, including undecorated blank activewear such as t-shirts, hoodies and fleeces, which are subsequently decorated by screen printing companies with designs and logos. The company also supplies branded and private label athletic, casual, and dress socks to retail companies in the United States including Gold Toe Brands, PowerSox, SilverToe, Auro, All Pro, and the Gildan brand. The company also manufactures and distributes Under Armour and New Balance brand socks. The company has approximately 50,000 employees worldwide, and owns and operates manufacturing facilities in Rio Nance, Honduras and the Caribbean.

Glenn and Greg Chamandy founded Gildan in 1984 with the acquisition of a knitting mill in Montreal, Quebec, Canada, to make fabric to supply Harley Inc., the childrenswear business already owned by the family. It later expanded to sell t-shirts made of 100% cotton to wholesalers, which resold them to United States and Canadian screen-printers, to be decorated with designs and logos. By 1994, Harley was closed in order to focus on the expansion of what had become Gildan Activewear.

Gildan has factories in low-wage countries like Honduras and Haiti, which has allowed Gildan to lower its price per shirt to below that of Chinese manufacturers as of 2006.

== Growth and acquisitions ==
Gildan opened its first offshore sewing facility in Honduras, in 1997. The plant was vertically integrated and employed 1,200 workers. A year later, the company achieved an initial public offering and was listed publicly on both the Toronto Stock Exchange and the NYSE American (then the American Stock Exchange).

By 2001, Gildan was the leading distributor of 100% cotton T-shirts in the US as determined by the ACNielsen S.T.A.R.S. Report. The next year, the company opened a knitting, bleaching, dyeing, finishing, and cutting facility in Rio Nance, Honduras.

In 2010, the company invested $15m in Shahriyar Fabric Industries Limited in Bangladesh to support planned growth in Asia and Europe.

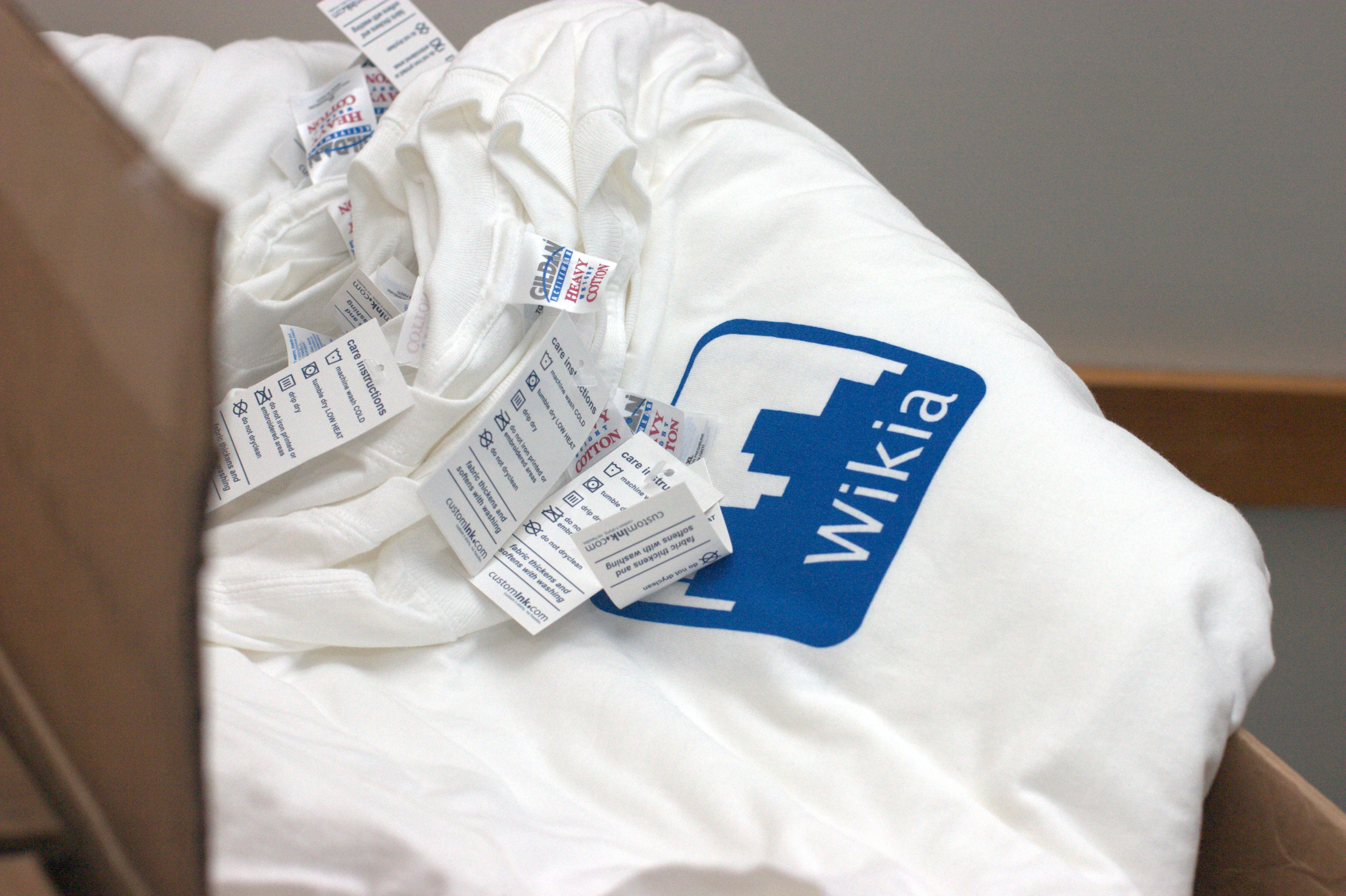
Gildan Activewear shirts with Wikia logo

In May 2012, Gildan again expanded with its purchase of 130-year old apparel maker Anvil Holdings, Inc., the parent company of Anvil Knitwear and producer of environmentally-friendly lines of sustainable, recycled, and organic apparel.

In 2014, Gildan acquired Doris Hosiery for CA$110 million.

In February 2015, Gildan announced its intent to purchase the Comfort Colors brand and assets, for a total purchase price of approximately US$100 million.

In 2016, Gildan announced its $55 million purchase of PEDS Legwear.

In 2017, Gildan acquired American clothing company American Apparel for $88 million.

In 2021, Gildan acquired 100 percent of the equity interests of Phoenix Sanford, LLC.

On 11 December 2023, Glenn J. Chamandy left his position as president and chief executive officer and director of the company. Vince Tyra was appointed president and CEO effective 12 February 2024, with Craig A. Leavitt assuming the position of president and Chief executive officer during the interim period.

On 19 March 2024, Gildan announced its intention to sell the company after a special committee review and amid a battle between its top stockholders, following the dismissal and proposed reinstatement of co-founder Glenn Chamandy as CEO.

On 13 August 2025, Gildan agreed to purchase American undergarments manufacturer Hanesbrands for US$2.2 billion in cash and stock. The deal is expected to close in late 2025 or early 2026. Shareholders have approved the deal.

In July 2026, Gildan entered an agreement to sell its Hanesbrands Australia business to BB FIT Investments for US$490 million.

== Advertising and sponsorships ==
Gildan bought a 30-second spot to air an advertisement during the third quarter of Super Bowl XLVII, broadcast 3 February 2013. The ad was part of an overall $25 million marketing push created by DeVito/Verdi, which included broadcast, print, digital, event marketing, and public relations. Gildan started speaking to the media about its Super Bowl ad in early December 2012.

The company also sponsored the New Mexico Bowl played in Albuquerque from 2011 through 2017.

In a 2017 commercial, Gildan depicted older men in (sometimes ill-fitting) white briefs and urged younger men not to wear their fathers' underwear. Blake Shelton was a spokesperson for the company.

== Allegations of labor rights violations ==
Genesis, S.A. is a Haitian factory manufacturing T-shirts whose main customer is Gildan Activewear. It has been accused as the most serious offender in a campaign of retaliatory dismissals, targeted at the leaders of a new labor rights and union organizing effort in Haiti's capital, Port-au-Prince. According to a 2012 report by Workers Rights Consortium, Gildan "ultimately intervened aggressively at Genesis and, to Gildan’s credit, played a pivotal role in achieving reinstatement. Hanesbrands played a similar role at Multiwear."
