= Parkhead Hall =

Coordinates: 53.345191°N 1.522148°W

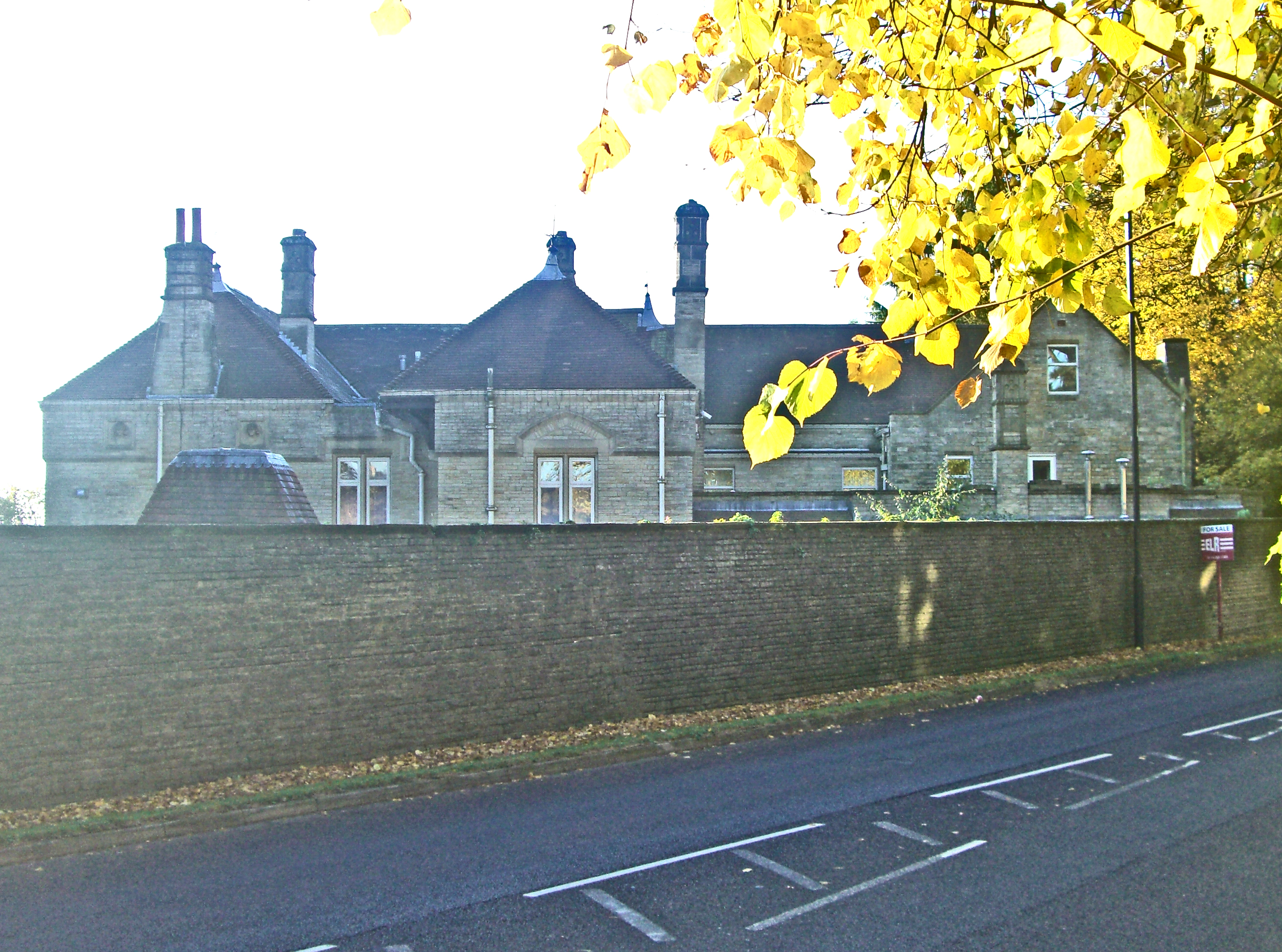
- Seen from Ecclesall Road South. The best public view of the hall

- Location within Sheffield

General information
- Status: Listed by Blenheim Park Estates
- Type: stately home
- Architectural style: grade II listed building
- Location: Parkhead Sheffield, England, United Kingdom
- Owner: Blenheim Estates Via Zoopla

Other information
- Parking: Yes

Website
- Blenheim Park Estates

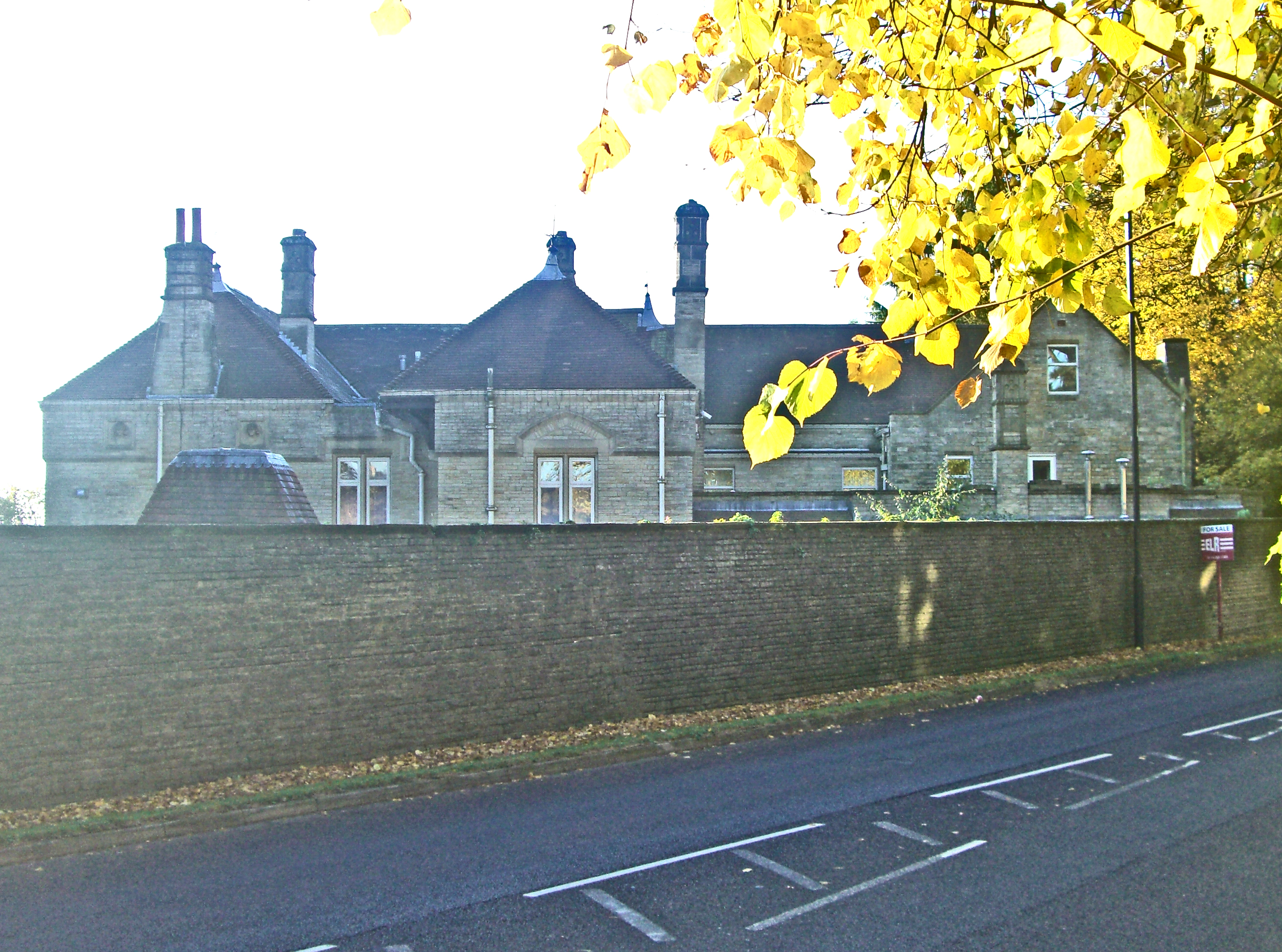
Seen from Ecclesall Road South. The best public view of the hall.

Parkhead Hall, formerly Parkhead House and The Woodlands, is an English country house situated in the City of Sheffield in South Yorkshire. The hall is a grade II listed building and is located in the suburb of Whirlow close to the junction of Ecclesall Road South and Abbey Lane. The hall is difficult to view for the general public, being surrounded by high walls and housing, although a glimpse of its northern side can be seen from Ecclesall Road South.

== History ==
The building was constructed in 1864 - 65 by the architect John Brightmore Mitchell-Withers (1838-1894) for his own use. It was originally named The Woodlands and Mitchell-Withers created the house as a Gothic fantasy with carved human heads looking out from the eaves and the front door. The dining room was panelled with oak taken from the long gallery of Sheffield Manor. The grounds were landscaped with many trees and included kitchen gardens, orchards, stables, a carriage house and harness room. Withers-Mitchell lived at The Woodlands with his wife Lise and by 1871 they had three children, the oldest of which, John, would also become a well-regarded architect like his father. John Mitchell-Withers senior died at the young age of 56 in 1894 and in June 1898 The Woodlands was sold to Sir Robert Hadfield, the metallurgist and owner of the vast Hadfields steel foundry in the east end of Sheffield.

Upon purchasing the house, Hadfield commenced on a series of extensive modifications between 1900 and 1903 using the architects R.G. Hammond and Wyngard, Dixon & Sandford. A two-storey extension was added comprising a billiard room, a library, two additional bedrooms and a bathroom. He also renamed the building Parkhead House. Hadfield owned the house for over forty years, staying there until 1939, a year before his death. Parkhead House was purchased in 1939 by Sheffield Corporation who had for some time been looking for a suitable house which could be used as Judges’ lodgings after the opening of the Assizes Courts in the city. The Corporation paid £6,750 for the property, however the outbreak of World War II prevented their use for the intended purpose and during the conflict the house was the headquarters of No. 33 Group RAF Balloon Command which was responsible for all barrage balloons and their sites in the industrial Midlands between March 1939 and September 1944.

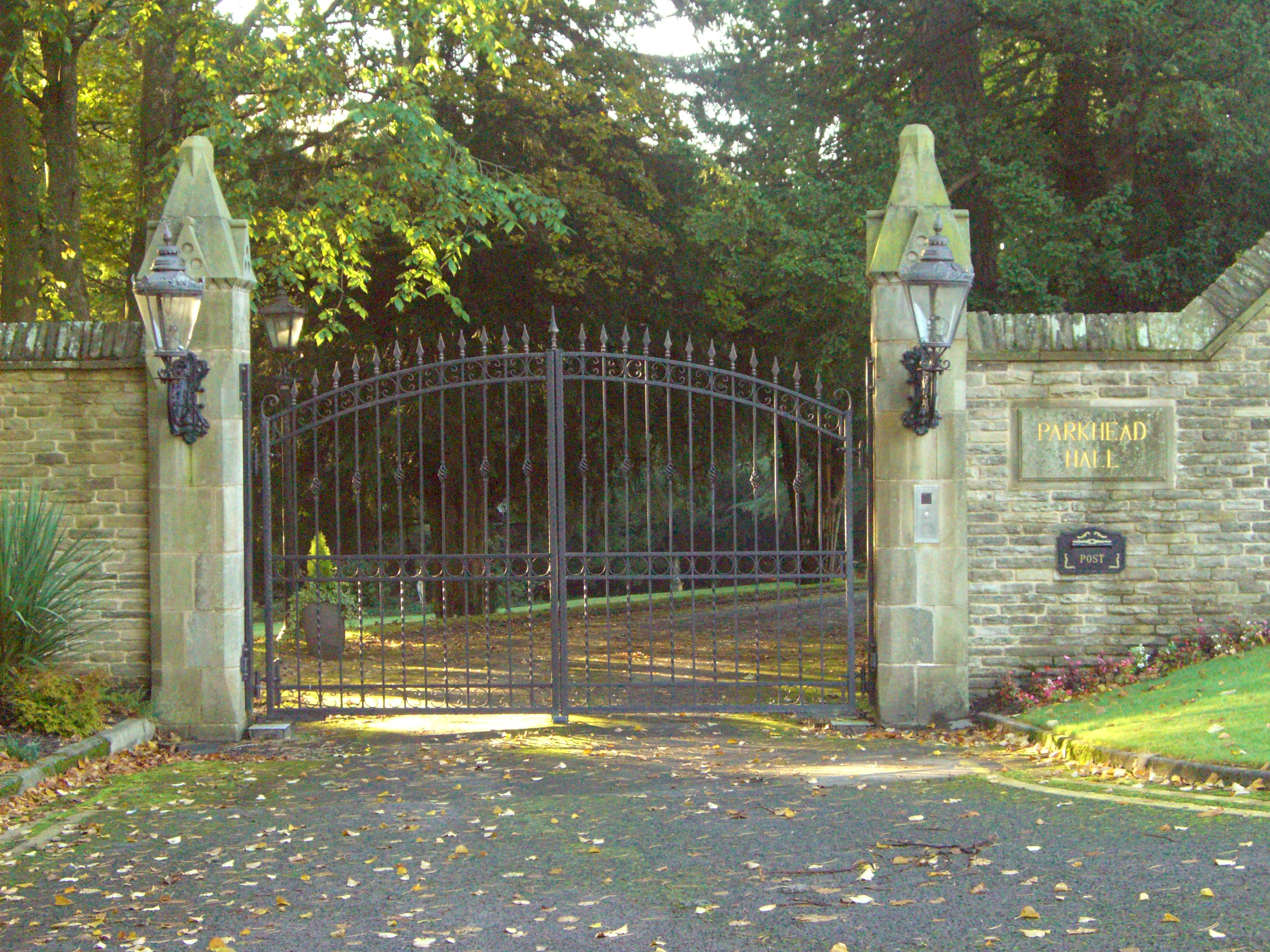
The entrance gates on Ecclesall Road South.

== Modern times ==
After the war Parkhead House reverted to the ownership of Sheffield Corporation and in 1948 was modified and opened as a nursing home for 35 elderly men. The house remained as a home for the elderly until 1988 when it became surplus to requirements and was put up for auction with four acres of land. The house was quite rundown when It was purchased in June 1989 for £1.2 million by the Facia Group, the retail empire headed by Sheffield businessman Stephen Hinchliffe. The house became the headquarters of the Facia Group and was restored over a number of years with the name being changed again to Parkhead Hall. June 1996 saw the financial collapse of the Facia Group. The Serious Fraud Office and officers from South Yorkshire Police raided Parkhead Hall in August 1996, taking away vanloads of documents as part of a criminal investigation into the finances of the group. Stephen Hinchliffe was declared bankrupt in March 2001 and Parkhead Hall was confiscated and sold back to his bank.

In 2003 the house was purchased by Andrew Hogg, director of several companies connected to camping, caravanning and outdoor activities, including Towsure and Campsure. Mr. Hogg turned the house back into a family residence. In early 2012 the house was once more up for sale with a potential selling price of £4 million. As of December 2013, the house is still for sale.

== Architecture ==
Parkhead Hall is constructed from squared stone with ashlar dressings, the light coloured exterior stone complements the pink roof tiles. There are three distinctive side wall chimney stacks along with the three on the roof. The windows are mainly casements. The extensive gardens of the original house have been gradually reduced over the years as the land was sold off for housing, allowing dwellings to be built on Abbey Lane. The building of these houses has blocked the former entrance on Abbey Lane leaving the main entrance on Ecclesall Road South as the only entry to the building.
