= Stephen Hinchliffe =

English businessman (born 1950)

Stephen Leonard Hinchliffe (born 2 January 1950, in Sheffield) is an English businessman from Sheffield who was the founder of the former retail empire Facia group, which had up to 850 stores before it collapsed in 1996. He has been a director of 60 companies. He was jailed in 2001 and 2003 for bribery and fraud.

== Business career ==
Hinchliffe was a car dealer in the 1970s. After training to be an accountant, Hinchliffe worked in a Sheffield engineering company and a Trent Regional Health Authority. He switched to marketing at grocers Mars and computer systems company Memorex.

=== Wilkes ===
In 1984, Hinchliffe led a management buyout of the Sheffield department store chain Wades, then suffering a £2m deficit, from Asda with a £200,000 stake. After the sale the chain returned a £2m profit and was sold on for £20m to Waring & Gillow – the buyout team made £7.3m profit and he personally made £2.9m. Using the profits from that sale and other property deals, including Norwich Union's Sheffield building, he bought the Midlands engineering firm James Wilkes, among other things a beermat maker, and became chairman after profits rapidly increased. The company headquarters was moved to Beauchief Hall in Sheffield, a stately home with a disco in the basement. Another engineering firm, Petrocon, attempted a hostile takeover of Wilkes and highlighted what it said were Hinchliffe's excesses, but the takeover failed in 1992. In the early 1990s, the West Midlands fraud squad arrested Hinchliffe without charge when investigating another company, WB Industries, who he had had property dealings with. He left Wilkes, receiving £533,000 in severance pay; he received a further £131,000 from a computer services company Lynx Holdings when he was forced to resign his chairmanship of that firm by the board.

After leaving Wilkes in 1992, he unsuccessfully took on several other companies in tennis court surfacing, soccer kits, and retail, including Shoesave, renamed to Echolake Properties, Bukta Sportswear, and surfacing company En-Tout-Cas, renamed to Boxgrey. Boxgrey collapsed in 1994, with shares being transferred to four British Virgin Islands companies just prior to the collapse. The DTI investigated all three company collapses. Other deals included buying Cooper Ludlam cutlery, Colibri lighters, French & Scott cosmetics, and property deals in Sheffield – including the Sheffield Royal Hospital site and the city centre Gateway Project. Up until being banned from being a company director until 2013 by the Department of Trade and Industry in 1998 due to the En-Tout-Cas/Boxgrey collapse, Hinchliffe had been on the board of 60 companies. His wife was also a director of some of the companies. He was declared bankrupt in 2001.

=== Facia group ===
In August 1994 he sold his remaining stake in Wilkes to engineering group Suter Plc (now part of Dow) and received a £3m loan from John Doherty, chief lending officer of the London branch of United Mizrahi Bank, Israel's fourth largest bank. He used the money to buy Salisbury's, a chain selling leather goods, from Signet (formerly Ratners) for £3.18m (Ratner had paid 25 times that six years earlier). The purchase was also backed by Murray Johnstone, a fund management company. This deal was the founding of Hinchliffe's Facia group. His personal company to manage his own finances was Chase Montagu, which was paid fees by Facia.

Hinchliffe's Facia group, with its headquarters at Parkhead Hall in Sheffield, rapidly became a retail empire with 850 British high street shops (more than Marks and Spencer at the time), over 6000 employees, and over £250m in turnover, second only to Littlewoods as a private retail group in the United Kingdom. Brands acquired at the pace of around one a month included clothing stores Sock Shop, Red or Dead, Contessa, and Oakland menswear, Torq jewellers, and the shoe shops Trueform, Saxone, Manfield, and Freeman Hardy and Willis, though only fashion chain Red or Dead was profitable. Facia expanded into continental Europe in March 1996 when they acquired the German Bata Shoes chain and renamed it Millennium. Hinchliffe's strategy was said to be buying well-known but apparently underperforming brand names, centralise warehouses and distribution, and upgrade stores, but also involved delaying payments to suppliers and channelling money to his private company. The group was partly sustained by shell companies that Hinchliffe used to borrow money. Facia bought the shoe shops from Sears, but only paid for the brand names, shelves and tills – in an unusual deal, Sears retained the leases, staff and stock. Murray Johnstone had sold Sock Shop to Hinchliffe and owned 50% of Facia. Rival companies and marketing analysts expressed scepticism over the rapid expansion, the merits of the business strategy in a difficult trading environment for high street brands versus out-of-town stores, the lack of coherence of the brands, and the lack of transparency over accounts and funding sources. Management Today said he was "Like someone playing Monopoly and buying whichever property they land on". A new headquarters was being built in Chelsea in 1996 where Laura Ashley's design HQ used to be, including a "high street" of all the Facia branches.

He bought Knoydart estate, west Highlands from Sheffield United chairman Reg Brealey's Titaghur company in 1998, with Christopher Harrison, the finance director of Facia. In May 1999 he was bought out by the local community for £850,000, leaving him with £1.4m debt.

==== Collapse and trials ====
Facia group did not file accounts in 1996 and attempted to change the terms of the rental agreement on the shops. United Mizrahi Bank decided to withdraw from lending, auditors including Deloitte and Touche declined to sign off the 1994/5 accounts for Sock Shop and Salisbury's, and the former owners and leasers of Saxone, Sears withdrew support. Hinchliffe tried to arrange a sale to Texas American Group, who later sued Facia for giving them misleading figures, but the group collapsed in June 1996, owing £70m, and was brought into receivership by KPMG and Grant Thornton. In December 1996 the Serious Fraud Office began an investigation.

Hinchliffe was charged with fraud in December 1998. A trial at the Old Bailey concluded that Hinchliffe paid £813,750 in 'gifts' to Doherty to obtain £13m of unsecured loans. Doherty and Hinchliffe were both jailed by Judge Graham Boal for five years in February 2001. Paul Brady of United Mizrahi and businessman Robert Leckie were also jailed. Financial director Christopher Harrison was sentenced in February 2000 for misappropriation of funds relating to Bata. Hinchliffe served two years of his sentence, which had been reduced to four years on appeal, and was released on probation in January 2003. He and associate Christopher Harrison were subsequently convicted by Judge Jeremy Roberts in April 2003 of fraud associated with Facia's invoices. Hinchliffe served a further 18-month sentence after pleading guilty to the £1.75m fraud, increased from a non-custodial 15-month suspended sentence in July 2003 after an appeal by the SFO and the Attorney General Lord Goldsmith. Twenty additional charges were dropped to save trial costs of up to £10m. He was released from jail in 2005.

=== Football ===
He owned 15% of Sheffield United football club and was on the board of directors; he attempted to become chairman but resigned in 1996 when Facia collapsed.

He owned 37% of Hull City football club, controlling the club with Nick Buchanan and acting as vice-president. His involvement was investigated by the FA.

=== Hoyland Fox ===
Hinchliffe was brought in by the Smith family, owners of Alexander Seven Marketing, to buy Hoyland Fox, a Goldthorpe-based umbrella company. He arranged the purchase by his wife's firm Mozaic in June 2007 using a loan from Hoyland Fox to Mozaic – a practice called "whitewashing." The Smiths said they believed the purchase was on their behalf, but Hinchliffe later claimed that the agreement had been a 50:50 share in ownership between the two families. The Hinchliffes tried to gain control over Hoyland Fox in early 2008 due to what they said were disputed expenses and false invoices, but the Smiths put the company into receivership by withdrawing funds. In March 2010, Hinchliffe and his wife were found guilty by Judge Hazel Marshall in the Chancery Division of the High Court of "conspiring with intent" to take over the company when acting as agents for the Smith family.

=== Benefit fraud ===
In July 2015, Hinchliffe pleaded guilty at Sheffield Magistrates Court to overclaiming £4,228.89 in pension credits during 2012 and 2013.

== Personal life ==
Hinchliffe was born in Sheffield and is the son of a civil servant or a postal clerk. He is married to Marjorie. He studied at New College, Oxford, leaving early to become an accountant. Prior to being jailed in 2001, Hinchliffe lived in a villa, Long Acres, in Dore, Sheffield, collecting over 50 classic cars, driving a Mercedes with number plate SH1, and buying the former helicopter of Gerald Ratner to use to fly to meetings. The villa and four cottages owned by the couple was put up for sale in August 2002 by the receivers PricewaterhouseCoopers to pay personal creditors. After being released in 2005, he lived in a £1.5m mansion owned by his wife in Hope, Derbyshire. In 2015, he was living in Greenhill, Sheffield.
