= Corgi Socks =

UK sock and knitwear manufacturer

- Type: Private
- Industry: Retail
- Founded: 1892; 134 years ago
- Headquarters: Ammanford, Wales, U.K.
- Key people: Christopher Jones, Co-Managing Director; Lisa Wood, Co-Managing Director
- Products: Socks; Knitwear
- Number of employees: 50 (2017)
- Website: www.corgisocks.com

Corgi Socks is the trading name of Corgi Hosiery Limited, is a Welsh manufacturer of luxury socks and knitwear in hand-knitted wool, cotton, and cashmere. The company, which was founded in 1892, is located in Ammanford, Wales, UK. It employs approximately 50 people.

Corgi is a subsidiary of Dewhurst Dent Plc, owners of Dents. Their sock manufacturing process employs many older machines; including rare 125-year-old Griswold hand-knitting machines, which are hand finished via traditional methods. Convsersely, Knitwear is hand-framed and intricate intarsia designs can be created. Customers include the British royal family.

== History ==
When Corgi was founded in 1892 by Rhys Jones, it began as a maker of socks for Welsh miners. Although Corgi has had different ownership, it has always been run by the Jones family. Currently the founder's great, great grandchildren, siblings Chris Jones and Lisa Wood manage the business. They took over from their father Huw Jones in 1997 and transitioned the business from making socks under other people's labels to growing the Corgi brand. It has been a subsidiary of Dewhurst Dent PLC since 2008.

In 1939, Corgi began making argyle pattern socks for Brooks Brothers. Corgi also made socks for the British troops during World War II. The company now makes knitwear under its own brand as well as for designers like Burberry and Thom Browne.

Queen Elizabeth II bought her socks from Corgi, and Prince George has a jumper made by the company. To raise funds for those impacted by the Manchester Arena bombing, socks decorated with bees were made – bees being a symbol of Manchester. In 2012 the company was fined following mishandling of asbestos by contractors during renovations to the roof.

In 2015, the business expanded with a 3,000-square feet extension and new knitting machines.

== Awards ==
Corgi received a royal warrant from the Prince of Wales (now Charles III) in 1989.

== See also ==
- List of sock manufacturers
