= List of sock manufacturers =

This is a list of sock manufacturers.

- Alanic
- Blacksocks
- Bombas
- Bonds
- Corgi Socks
- Darn Tough Vermont
- Fox River Mills
- Gold Toe Brands
- Hanesbrands
- Happy Socks
- Holeproof Hosiery
- Jockey International
- PEDS Legwear
- QT Inc.
- The Railroad Sock
- Renfro Brands
- SmartWool
- Sock Shop
- Stance
- Swiss Barefoot Company
- Tabio
- Wigwam Mills

== See also ==
- List of fashion designers
- List of lingerie brands
- List of swimwear brands
