= Tie Rack =

UK-based tie retailer

Tie Rack Ltd
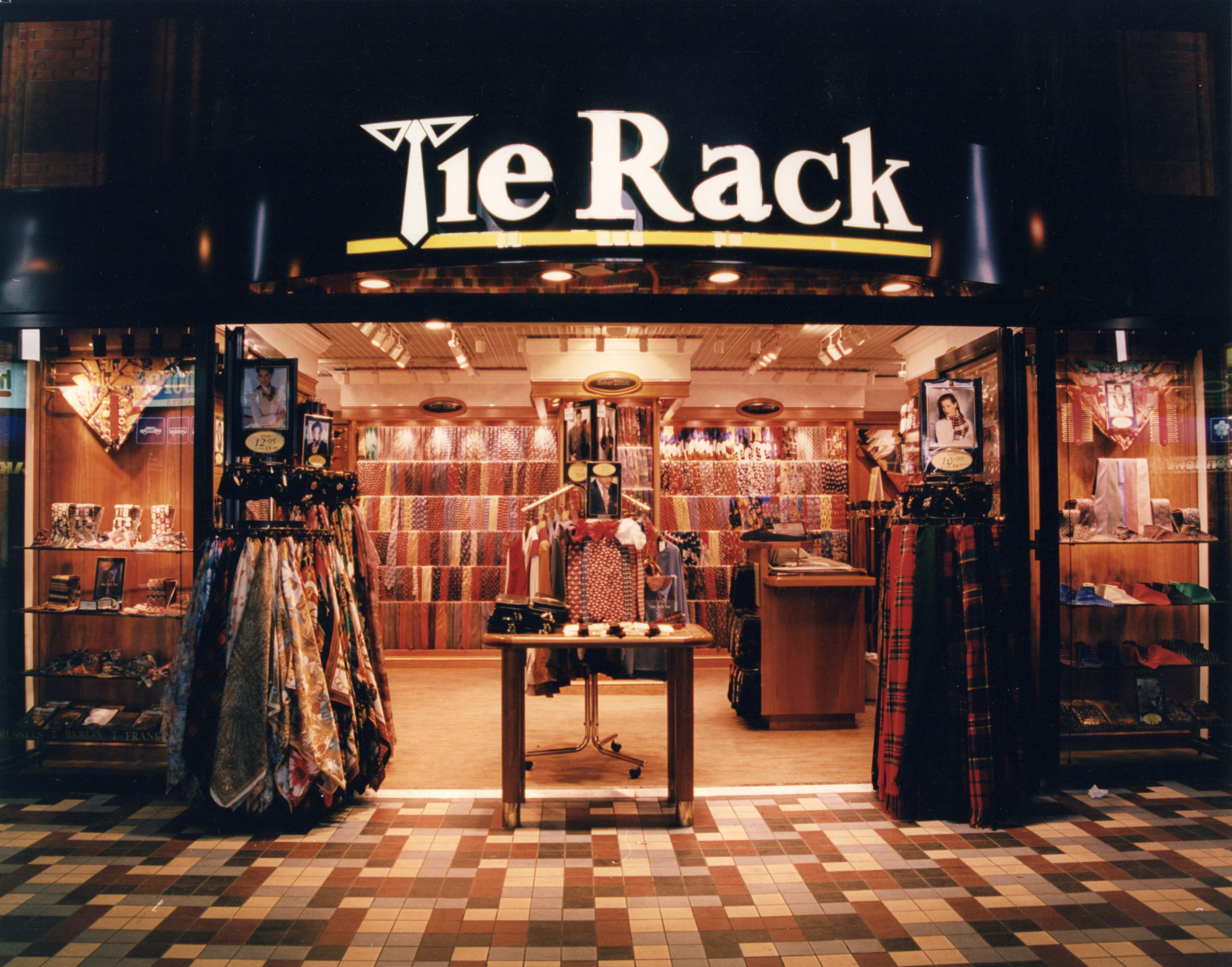
- Industry: Retail (Clothing)
- Founded: August 1981
- Defunct: 2013
- Headquarters: London, England
- Key people: Simon Barnett (Director)
- Website: https://www.thetierack.co.uk/

Tie Rack Ltd was a British-based tie retailer that sold scarves, cufflinks, and many other items of clothing. The stores were often small due to the nature of the product, and as such, were found in airports, railway stations, and shopping centres across the world.

Tie Rack Ltd was founded in August 1981 by Roy Bishko. The first store opened in London at 91 Oxford Street; it was converted from a heel bar owned by Bishko from which he had trialled selling ties.

The first airport store opened at Glasgow Airport in 1984 and there was a flagship store at 295 Oxford Street opposite John Lewis. At one time, there were over 330 stores in 24 countries.

After a phase of consolidation, Tie Rack started to expand again in 2008–09. In July 2009 they had about 260 shops in 26 countries, and about 190 shops in at least 14 countries of the EU, with more than 1,500 employees.

In 1999, the chain store was bought by Frangi SpA Group, and, at the time, benefited from this buyout by being able to sell products under the Frangi brand.

In 2007 Fingen Group, Firenze, Italy got the hold of the majority stake.

== Trading fascias ==
In 2000 and 2001, the company trialled two different fascias. This was due to Tie Rack's development into a fully fledged fashion accessories retailer.

The first trial commenced in September 2000 at the Southampton store and this store was branded Le Collezioni – Tie Rack.

The second trial commenced in August 2001 at the Regent Street store, with a shop fit designed by Belgian Architect Pierre Vanden Broeck, and this store was branded Frangi – Tie Rack.

Both trials were rolled out to several stores, but it was eventually decided to remain trading under the Tie Rack name as this name had good brand recognition with consumers.

All new and refurbished shops were branded with a refined version of the original Tie Rack logo and are sub-branded Frangi – Collezioni. In 2008 they no longer used the sub-branding, it was changed to "London".

== Rolling Luggage ==
Rolling Luggage was a subsidiary of Tie Rack. It is a chain of around 30 stores, located exclusively in 'transport' locations, specialising in selling premium luggage on wheels.

In some locations (including, for example, Glasgow Airport) there are dual-branded Tie Rack/Rolling Luggage stores.

The chain is also based at the group head office in Brentford and shares many of the head office support functions with the parent chain such as IT, Finance and Human Resources.

== Tumi ==
Tie Rack was managed in some countries' Tumi stores as a franchisee of Tumi Inc. or its daughters.

== Genesis Colors Pvt Ltd ==
On 2 June 2009 Jacopo Fratini, Director of Tie Rack Retail Group Ltd. (and Consigliari of Fingen SpA) signed a licensing agreement with Genesis Colors Pvt Ltd.

Genesis Colors intends to open 10 exclusive outlets in the first year and is aiming for 130 sales points at the end of the fifth year in India.

== Endorsees ==
Many celebrities endorsed the Tie Rack brand, notable businessmen including Liverpool F.C. CEO Rick Parry.

== Closure ==
It was announced on 19 November 2013 that Tie Rack would begin closure of the remaining 44 retail stores on 20 November 2013.

== See also ==
- Sock Shop
