= Wigwam Mills =

Hosiery manufacturer

Wigwam Mills, Inc.
- Industry: Consumer goods
- Founded: 1905; 121 years ago
- Founders: Herbert Chesebro, Robert Ehany, Lawerance Bentz
- Headquarters: Sheboygan, Wisconsin; United States
- Key people: Margaret Newhard, Chris Chesebro co-owners
- Products: Socks, hats, gloves
- Website: www.wigwam.com

Wigwam Mills is a hosiery company based in Sheboygan, Wisconsin, United States.

The company was founded in 1905 by Herbert Chesebro, Robert Ehany, and Lawerance Bentz in Sheboygan, Wisconsin. The company struggled during the Great Depression but the company stayed in business thanks to a loan from the Citizens Bank. During World War II, the company devoted up to 75% of its capacity to the war effort. By 1945, the company had expanded its line to include baseball hosiery, anklets, hockey caps, mittens, and socks for all types of activities. The company prospered for the next 65 years knitting socks, headwear, and other knit products. From the mid-1980s through the late 1990s the Wigwam 622 slouch socks became very popular.

In the 1990s, the company developed the Ultimax and INgenious brands, each with patented sock technology and, in 2022, Wigwam became the official sock of U.S. Ski & Snowboard.

== Early history ==
Wigwam Mills was founded in 1905 by Herbert Chesebro, Robert Ehany, and Lawerance Bentz in Sheboygan, Wisconsin, a year after the Sheboygan Knitting Company burned to the ground. All three founders were employees of the company and purchased equipment and recruited employees from their former company. The new company was founded under the name "Hand Knit Hosiery Company." It made socks and headwear, primarily from wool, for the residents and lumbermen of the area. At the time the company was supplied by numerous nearby wool mills.

By 1922, Herbert Chesebro gained partial control of the company after purchasing Bentz's share. The company flourished under Chesebro, however when the stock market crashed, the hosiery industry struggled in the difficult economy of the Great Depression. After Herbert's death, the company had bank loans totaling $100,000. With the help of J.W. Hansen of the Citizens Bank, the company stayed in business.

In 1936, Robert Chesebro, Sr., after having worked at the company for 12 years, gained complete control of it. The company devoted up to 75% of its capacity to knitting for the troops overseas. By 1945 the company had expanded its line to include baseball hosiery, anklets, hockey caps, mittens, and socks for all types of activities. The company prospered for the next 65 years knitting socks, headwear, and other knit products. On January 1, 1957, the company changed its name from Hand-Knit Hosiery to Wigwam Mills, based on the popularity of the brand. The company continued under the leadership of Robert Chesebro, Sr., and eventually the third generation of ownership, Robert Chesebro, Jr.

== Recent history ==
The 1980s saw growth in many areas for Wigwam. A new logo and more technical synthetic fibers were utilized to develop products such as the Poly-Wool line of performance socks as well as the overnight success—Moraine.

From the mid-1980s through the late 1990s the Wigwam 622 slouch socks became very popular. They were worn in various ways by kids, tweens, teens, college students and adults to show them off. The socks were not only worn as athletic wear but everyday fashions too, including: rolling up one's jeans or khakis, wearing the socks over skinny jeans or other cotton pants, or under ankle-length skirts and dresses. Two other very popular styles were one wearing the socks over leggings with Keds or boat shoes with oversized tees, oversized sweaters, an oversized sweater or oversized sweatshirt over a turtleneck. And two wearing the white color of the socks over opaque tights with a babydoll or skater dress and white Keds or in warmer weather with bike shorts showing from under the babydoll or skater dress with the white Keds.

In the 1990s, the company developed the Ultimax and INgenious brands. Each featured a patented sock technology. In 2007, both brands were brought under the Wigwam brand umbrella. Ultimax became Wigwam Pro and INgenious became Wigwam Fusion.

In 2020, siblings Chris Chesebro and Margaret Newhard took over the helm of the company from their father Robert Chesebro, Jr. Later in 2021, Wigwam was awarded a patent for custom-fitting socks, designed to more-truly fit the anatomical shape of a foot compared to other socks. In 2022, Wigwam became the official sock of the US Ski and Snowboard Team.

== See also ==
- List of sock manufacturers
