= Tabio (company) =

Japanese manufacturer and retailer of clothing

Tabio Corporation
- Company type: socks and tights
- Founded: 1968; 58 years ago
- Number of locations: Japan, US, France, UK, China, Taiwan
- Website: Tabio Japan; Tabio USA

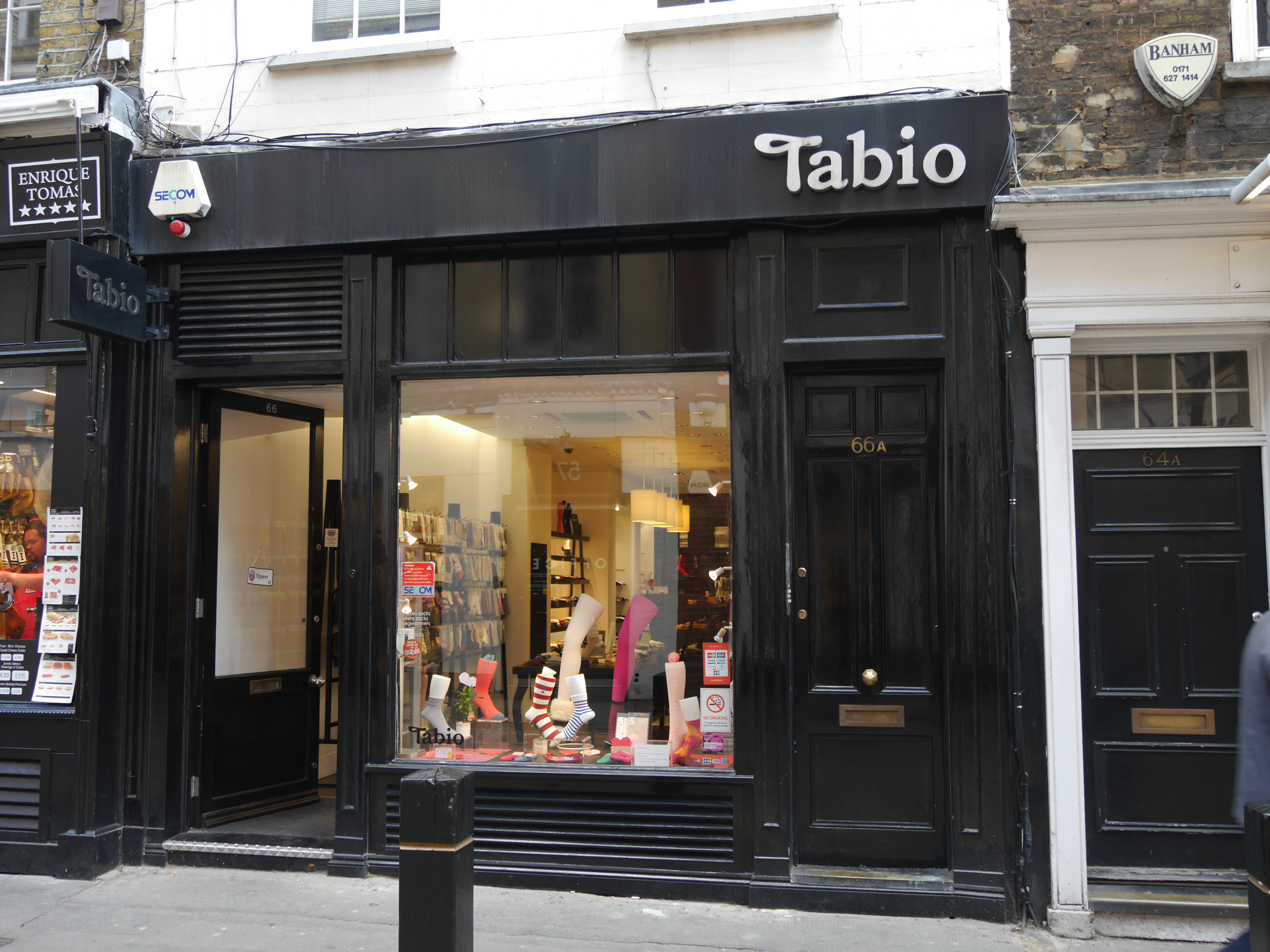
Tabio, Neal Street, Covent Garden, London

Tabio is a Japanese manufacturer and retailer of socks, stockings and tights.

Tabio has 270 stores in Japan, US, France, UK, China and Taiwan.

== See also ==
- List of sock manufacturers
