= Vince Tyra =

American athletic administrator

Biographical details
- Born: December 1, 1965 (age 60); Louisville, Kentucky, U.S.
- Education: University of Kentucky (BS)

Playing career
- 1985–88: Kentucky
- Position: Pitcher

Administrative career (AD unless noted)
- 2018–21: Louisville

Vince Tyra (/ˈtaɪreɪ/ TY-ray) (born December 1, 1965) is an American businessman and athletic administrator, who is best known for his tenure as the athletic director at the University of Louisville. He served in this role from 2018 until his resignation in December 2021. Tyra replaced embattled Tom Jurich, who faced allegations of misconduct regarding the 2017–18 NCAA Division I men's basketball corruption scandal.

Tyra is currently Senior Vice President of Corporate Strategy, Mergers & Acquisitions at Houchens Industries.

== Early life and education ==
Tyra's father, Charlie Tyra, played basketball for the Louisville Cardinals men's basketball program from 1954 to 1957 and is regarded as one of the greatest players in program history. In 1984, Tyra graduated from Trinity High School in Louisville and in 1988 he earned a Bachelor of Science degree in health administration from the University of Kentucky.

== Career ==
In 1997, Tyra was recruited by Fruit of the Loom to take charge of the active wear division in the apparel manufacturing company. He was soon promoted and leaded the company as a president. Three years later, Tyra attained a position of Executive Officer at AlphaBroder and held this mandate for six years. In 2007, Tyra chose to leave AlphaBroder due to health issues with his family and a relationship with Bain Capital. A year later, he became an Operating Partner with Southfield Capital, a private investment firm, where he became a member of the Investment Committee of the equity fund and also a member of the Credit Committee of the mezzanine fund.

From 2008 to 2018, Tyra joined ISCO Industries as Advisory Board Member. Concurrently, he assumed the role as President and Chief Executive Officer from 2013 to 2016. In parallel, he also served as Chairman of the Board of Elite Medical. Over the years, he then served as Interim Chief Executive Officer of Total Fleet Solutions, Dealer Financial Services, and Elite Medical.

In 2017, Tyra joined the University of Louisville to serve as Vice President, Director of Athletics.On March 27, 2018, Tyra hired Chris Mack to be the next head coach of the University's Men's basketball team. The hire was widely praised and has led to early success in recruiting. Tyra has said that the hire has sparked "morale [to be] up" within a program and fanbase marred by scandals in recent years. On August 22, 2018, Tyra received an email from his predecessor's son, Mark Jurich. The email received publicity because of its scathing nature, but both sides have downplayed its importance.

On December 3, 2018, it was reported by The Courier-Journal that Tyra had hired Scott Satterfield as the new head coach of the Louisville Cardinals football team, replacing the fired Bobby Petrino.

On December 8, 2021, Tyra resigned as the athletic director at the University of Louisville. A few months later in May 2022 Tyra accepted an offer from Houchens Industries to become Senior Vice President, Corporate Strategy and Mergers and Acquisitions. On December 12, 2023, Vince Tyra was appointed to be the CEO and President of Canadian manufacturer of branded clothing Gildan Activewear Inc.

== Personal life ==
Vince Tyra is married to Lori and has five children.
