= PEDS Legwear =

International legwear company

Peds Legwear, Inc.
- Formerly: Richelieu Knitting; Richelieu Legwear
- Company type: Private
- Industry: Hosiery manufacturer
- Founded: 1934; 92 years ago in Sorel-Tracy, Quebec
- Founder: Simard family
- Defunct: July 27, 2016; 9 years ago
- Fate: Acquired by Gildan
- Headquarters: Montreal, Quebec, Canada
- Key people: Michael D. Penner, (President and CEO)
- Brands: PEDS
- Website: www.peds.com

Peds Legwear, formerly known as Richelieu Legwear and before that Richelieu Knitting, was an international legwear company that manufactured socks and other hosiery. As its height, the company had offices in Montreal, Quebec; Hildebran, North Carolina; and Shanghai, China. It was acquired by fellow Canadian clothing manufacturer Gildan in 2016, who continues to manufacture and sell products under the PEDS brand, but otherwise terminated all Peds manufacturing operations with two years after the close of the sale.

== History ==
The Simard family founded Richelieu Legwear in Sorel-Tracy, Quebec in 1934. The family gained prominence in the region as shipbuilders and owners of Marine Industries (M.I.). Richelieu grew to eventually employee over 600 people in Quebec at its peak in 2002. The Simards maintained ownership of Richelieu until 1997, when Harvey Penner a Montreal businessman who joined Richelieu in the 1960s as a sales manager bought out the Simards and became president of Richelieu Knitting. He remained with the company until 2006 when he sold the Richelieu Hosiery division to his son, Michael D. Penner, who is currently president and CEO.

The company suffered in the late 1990s and early 2000s, when unfavorable exchange rates, competition from China and other lower costs countries impacted the Canadian manufacturing industry. Like many other Canadian textile companies, Richelieu moved production off-shore or risk going bankrupt.

In 2011, PEDS Legwear invested $7 million to buy the assets of International Legwear Group (ILG), a failing sock company based in Hildebran (Burke County), North Carolina, including the flagship PEDS and MediPEDS brands. In 2014, Richelieu Legwear changed its name to PEDS Legwear to better reflect its new main brand.

In 2007, Deloitte named Richelieu Hosiery as one of Canada's 50 best managed companies. In 2013, the Canadian Chamber of Commerce and Grant Thornton LLP named Richelieu Legwear as a finalist for the 2013 Private Business Growth Award.

In 2014, Peds announced it was investing $16 million and hiring 200 workers at its Hildebran location over a five-year period after a multi-year commitment from Walmart.

In June 2016, the Governor's Office and the North Carolina Department of Commerce announced the award of a $500,000 building reuse grant to Peds so it could expand the Hildebran location with the promise of adding 50 new jobs. Burke County and the town of Hildebran approved a 5 percent match to the state grant.

In 2016, Gildan announced its $55 million purchase of PEDS.

In 2018, Gildan Activewear Inc. announced its plans to close the operation in Hildebran and lay off all of its manufacturing and distribution workers.

== U.S. investment ==
President Obama's remarks at the 2015 SelectUSA Investment Summit

With its investment in ILG, PEDS Legwear became part of the rebirth of the American manufacturing sector, which had sustained severe losses during the Great Recession, particularly in the textile industry. On March 11, 2015, the company opened a new $16 million manufacturing facility in Hildebran that is projected to create more than 205 jobs by 2018. This investment was part of the SelectUSA Investment Summit program of the United States Department of Commerce. As a result, PEDS has been cited as an example of how foreign investment can save and create American manufacturing jobs. Penner was invited by President Barack Obama to talk about the company's investment at a roundtable meeting.

== See also ==
- List of sock manufacturers
