= Sanford Lockwood Cluett =

American engineer who invented Sanforized cotton

- Born: June 6, 1874; Troy, New York
- Died: May 17, 1968 (age 93); Palm Beach, Florida
- Education: Rensselaer Polytechnic Institute
- Occupations: inventor, businessman
- Employer(s): Cluett, Peabody & Co. Walter A. Wood Company
- Organization: New York National Guard
- Known for: Inventing Sanforization, Clupak paper, and bubble sextant

Sanford Lockwood Cluett (June 6, 1874 – May 17, 1968) was an American engineer, inventor, and businessman who invented Sanforization (1928), a process to pre-shrink woven fabrics, and Clupak paper (1957) used for stretchable shopping bags and wrapping paper. Cluett held about 200 patents covering a variety of techniques. Cluett was vice president and a director of Cluett, Peabody and Company, Inc. of Troy, New York. During 1904–1917, Cluett had served in the New York National Guard, reaching the rank of major.

== Life and work ==
Sanford Lockwood Cluett was born on June 6, 1874, in Troy, NY, as son of Edmund Cluett and Mary Alice Stone Cluett. He attended the local Troy Academy, graduating in 1894. Cluett received a civil engineering degree from Rensselaer Polytechnic Institute (RPI) in 1898.

In 1897, Cluett had joined the New York National Guard, in the rank of private. He was active in the New York Volunteer Infantry during the Spanish–American War. By July 1898, he was transferred to the First U.S. Volunteer Engineers, along with serving in the Puerto Rican campaign. Eventually he was promoted to captain. During 1904–1917, he served in the New York National Guard, where he achieved the rank of major prior to retirement.

Cluett was known for several inventions, including a sextant and farm mowers, before patents for Sanforizing. In 1896, he invented the bubble sextant for use in celestial navigation. In 1901 he was hired by the Walter A. Wood Company in Hoosick Falls, New York, for the manufacturing of mowers, reapers and other farm machinery. In developing some horse-drawn mowers operable from the driver's seat, his two-horse and one-horse mowers had a vertical lift at the cutting bar.

In 1919, Sanford Cluett joined the company Cluett, Peabody & Co., which had been founded by his uncles as a textile firm which made men's clothing, including Arrow collars and Arrow shirts. He became Research Director, and in 1927 became vice president of the firm.

In 1928, he developed the process of Sanforizing (patented in 1930), to pre-shrink cotton or other fabrics by squeezing material against a stretched rubber strip or band and allowing the pair to shrink together in order to offset the stretching of fabrics during prior weaving or finishing.

Sanford Cluett also held over 200 patents, for various techniques, including Clupak extensible paper as a stretchable paper (Investment Reader, April 15, 1959) used for shopping bags and wrapping paper with magazines, meat, tyres, and furniture.

After a period of failing health, Sanford Cluett died on May 17, 1968, at his winter home in Palm Beach, Florida, at age 93.

== See also ==
- bubble sextant
- ball recording sextant
- Eli Whitney, inventor of the cotton gin
