= Sanforization =

Process to preshrink fabric

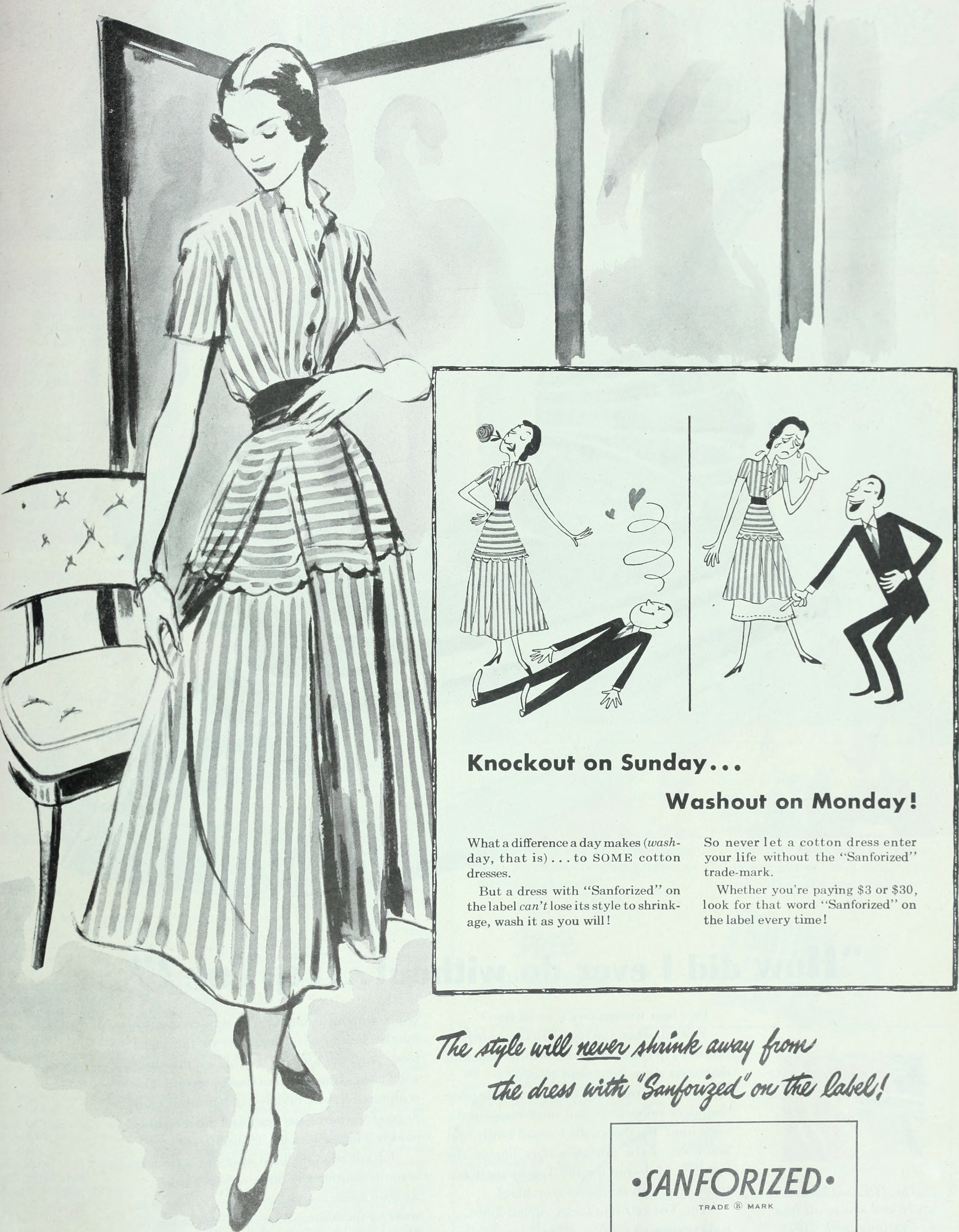
A 1948 advertisement for sanforized cotton fabric

Sanforization is a treatment for fabrics to reduce shrinkage from washing. The process was patented by Sanford Lockwood Cluett (1874–1968) in 1930. It works by stretching, shrinking, and fixing the woven cloth in both length and width before cutting and producing, to reduce the shrinkage which would otherwise occur after washing. The original patent mentioned "goods of cotton, linen, woolen, silk, rayon, and combinations thereof".

== Process ==
The cloth is continually fed into the sanforizing machine and therein moistened with either water or steam. A rotating cylinder presses a rubber sleeve against another, heated, rotating cylinder. Thereby, the sleeve briefly gets compressed and laterally expanded, afterwards relaxing to its normal thickness. The cloth to be treated is transported between a rubber sleeve and a heated cylinder and is forced to follow this brief compression and lateral expansion, and relaxation. It is thus shrunk.

The greater the pressure applied to the rubber sleeve during sanforization, the less shrinking will occur once the garment is in use. The process may be repeated.

The aim of the process is a cloth which does not shrink significantly during production, cutting, ironing, sewing, or especially, by wearing and washing the finished clothes. Cloth and articles made from it may be labelled to have a specific shrink-proof value (if pre-shrunk), e.g., of under 1%.

== Applications ==
Karate gis (traditional Japanese karate uniforms) are often made from Sanforized cotton so that shrinkage does not occur with this heavy material. Karate uniforms are often of 10, 12, 14, or 16 ounces per yard (310, 370, 430, or 500 g/m) cotton so shrinkage can be quite severe after washing and drying. Sanforized gis are typically labelled as pre-shrunk. Fencers' protective jackets are usually made of unsanforized cotton canvas.
