= Happy Socks =

Swedish clothing manufacturer and retailer

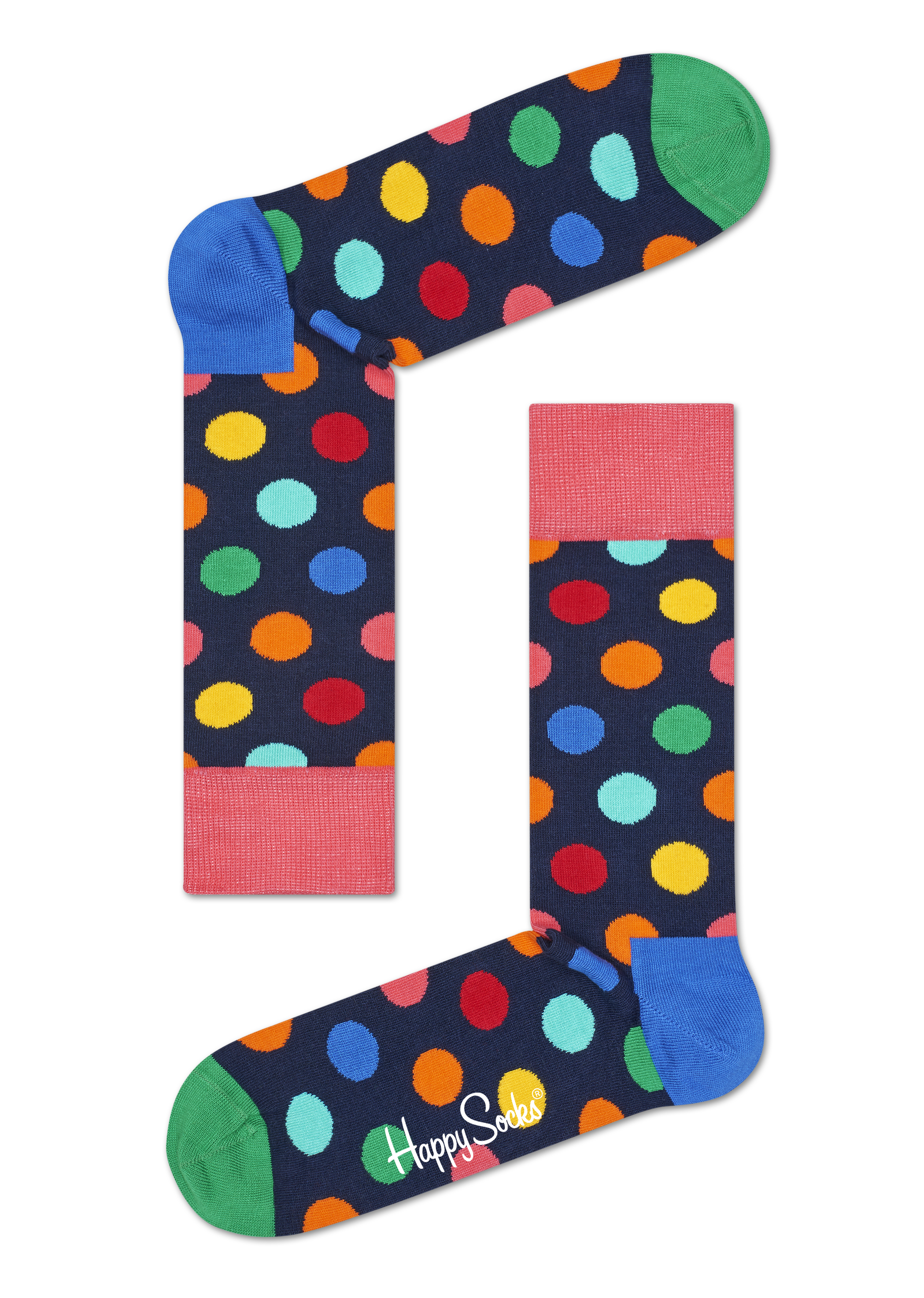
- Happy Socks' Big Dot pattern
- Type: Private
- Industry: Clothing manufacturing
- Founded: 2008; 18 years ago
- Founders: Viktor Tell; Mikael Söderlindh
- Headquarters: Stockholm, Sweden
- Key people: Alexander Meyer (CEO, 2023–)
- Products: Socks; swimwear; underwear
- Parent: Palamon Capital Partners (majority shareholder)
- Website: www.happysocks.com

Happy Socks, Neal Street, Covent Garden, London

Happy Socks is a Swedish manufacturer, designer, and retailer of socks and other apparel founded in 2008 by CEO Mikael Söderlindh and creative director Viktor Tell.

Their merchandise is sold online and through in-person retail distributors. There are approximately 100 Happy Socks stores across Australia, Brazil, China, France, Germany, Greece, Japan, Portugal, Spain, Sweden, the United Kingdom and the U.S.

In 2017, Palamon Capital Partners acquired the majority share of the company, valuing the business at $81 million, or SEK 725 million. As of 2023, Alexander Meyer is the CEO of Happy Socks.

== Company history ==
Happy Socks began in April 2008, when advertising executive Mikael Söderlindh and graphic designer Viktor Tell came up with the idea of colorful, printed socks as a brand. Three weeks later, production began in a Turkish factory. The socks launched at a price point of $10, and were initially sold on the company’s website. In the first year, Happy Socks' turnover was €1 million (US$1,390,000). In 2016, the brand generated retail sales of US$106.4 million.

In 2017, private equity firm Palamon Capital Partners acquired a majority stake in the company from Scope Growth III. At the time, they invested US$81.2 million in Happy Socks stock, and Palamon invested about US$4.5 million of growth capital.

As of 2018, the brand had sold more than 40 million socks worldwide. Happy Socks expanded to produce underwear and children's socks in 2014. In 2015, the company added an athletic collection aimed at sneaker wearers and a men's dress collection. In 2017, they launched Hysteria, a fashion collection of materials such as viscose, glitter, and nylon manufactured in Portugal and Italy. Happy Socks had previously been stocked in stores such as Barneys New York and Opening Ceremony; this new collection, designed by associate creative director Paula Maso, moved Happy Socks into retailers such as Selfridges, John Lewis, Urban Outfitters, Tessuti, Bloomingdale's, Galeries Lafayette, Voo Berlin, and 10 Corso Como.

By the end of 2018, Happy Socks opened 100 concept stores in Paris, London, Barcelona, Los Angeles, Stockholm and Tokyo. In December 2018, the brand opened its third shop in New York City. In May 2019, they opened a second store in Los Angeles.

Happy Socks began producing men's swim trunks in 2018. In Spring 2019, Happy Socks expanded the swimwear line to include a women's line, slider footwear, beach bags, towels, and pool floats.

In addition to its headquarters in central Stockholm, Sweden, the company opened an office in New York City in 2018, followed by an office in Munich in January 2019.

== Celebrity partnerships ==
In addition to the Happy Socks original line, the brand attracted several celebrities who collaborated on creative projects and sock designs. In 2013, David LaChapelle photographed the fall marketing campaign, which featured male and female dancers with socks.

Film director Robert Rodriguez, known for El Mariachi, From Dusk till Dawn and the Spy Kids franchise, created “Sock 'Em Dead,” a short promotional movie starring Madison Davenport (From Dusk till Dawn: The Series) as an actress making a vampire film who utilizes socks as a weapon, appearing alongside Danny Trejo and Wilmer Valderrama; Rodriguez's sock designs were vampires.

Video director Tim Erem partnered with Happy Socks to make a promotional video called "Happy Holidays" in 2018 that starred Pedro Pascal and was choreographed by Michael Rooney.

Marking its 10th anniversary in 2018, Happy Socks released designs that paid tribute to Andy Warhol, a collaboration with recording artist Wiz Khalifa, and a second series with The Beatles, celebrating the 50th anniversary of the group's film, Yellow Submarine. In addition, the company has collaborated with the Elton John AIDS Foundation and released Keith Haring socks and underwear.

Happy Socks has collaborated with celebrities, brands and musicians such as Iris Apfel, Ellen von Unwerth, André Martins, Adidas, Billionaire Boys Club, Giles Deacon, ASAP Rocky, Miike Snow, Steve Aoki, Snoop Dogg and The Rolling Stones.

In April 2019, Happy Socks released a short film collaboration with David Hasselhoff called "The Hoff's Day Off," which includes swimwear in colorful prints and summer accessories for men and women. Hasselhoff stars in the accompanying video campaign.

In 2020, Happy Socks released a collection of '80s Mickey Mouse-themed socks in collaboration with Disney. This collaboration returned in 2021, when Happy Socks released a second series of socks featuring Disney's Sensational Six characters: Mickey and Minnie Mouse, Daisy and Donald Duck, Goofy and Pluto. The same year, the company also released a Pippi Longstocking collection, a Zandra Rhodes collaboration, and a series of Monty Python socks.

In 2022, Happy Socks collaborated with several entities, such as The Smiley Company, the World Wide Fund for Nature and Studio Barnhus.

In 2023, Happy Socks once again released a collection of The Beatles socks. The same year, the company also released a Simpsons collection and a Star Wars collection.

In 2024, the company engaged in several collaborative efforts, including Awake NY, Rebel Walls, Elton John, The Beatles, and The Rolling Stones.

== See also ==
- List of sock manufacturers
