= Tom Jurich =

University of Louisville athletic director

Biographical details
- Born: July 26, 1956 (age 70); Alhambra, California, U.S.
- Education: Northern Arizona University

Playing career
- 1974–1977: Northern Arizona
- 1978: New Orleans Saints
- Position: Placekicker

Administrative career (AD unless noted)
- 1988–1994: Northern Arizona
- 1994–1997: Colorado State
- 1997–2017: Louisville

Thomas M. Jurich (born July 26, 1956) is an American former college sports administrator and former football player. He previously served as the vice president and director of athletics at the University of Louisville. He was hired at the University of Louisville on October 21, 1997, after holding the same positions at Colorado State University and Northern Arizona University, and was fired on October 18, 2017, following a pay-for-play corruption scandal in NCAA basketball. On October 1, 2007, Jurich and the university entered into a contract that runs through July 26, 2023. The agreement was an extension of an agreement that began April 1, 2004. In 2007, Jurich was selected Street & Smith's SportsBusiness Journal/SportsBusiness Daily National Athletic Director of the year.

Jurich was born in Alhambra, California and played kicker at Arcadia High School, at Northern Arizona University, and in one game for the New Orleans Saints of the National Football League (NFL), after being drafted 276th overall in the 10th round of the 1978 NFL draft. Jurich spent four years at Colorado State University, starting in early 1994, as athletics director. Previously, he had been the athletics director for Northern Arizona from 1988 to 1994.

One of his first actions in his time at the University of Louisville was to replace Ron Cooper with John L. Smith as football coach, in an attempt to boost fan support before the move to the new Papa John's Cardinal Stadium. One of his notable accomplishments was bringing Rick Pitino to the University of Louisville on March 21, 2001. Pitino considered accepting the basketball coaching job at University of Michigan, but told the media, "I can't get on the phone and tell Tom no. I can't tell him this." Pitino replaced Denny Crum.

Jurich was placed on unpaid administrative leave on September 27, 2017, after the Louisville basketball program was implicated in an FBI investigation for a pay for play corruption scandal in NCAA basketball. His contract was formally terminated on October 20, 2017. On May 18, 2018, the board of trustees agreed to a $4.5 million settlement with Jurich that cleared him of any wrongdoing and phrased his termination as "retirement".

== Education ==
Jurich studied at Northern Arizona, graduating with a degree in finance in 1980. He was voted class president at Northern Arizona in 1979.

== Family ==
Jurich and his wife, Terrilynn, have four children: sons Mark and Brian, and twin daughters Haley and Lacey.
