= Gold Toe Brands =

Socks company

Gold Toe Brands, Inc.
- Company type: Private
- Industry: Clothing manufacturer
- Founded: September 18, 1919; 106 years ago in Bally, Pennsylvania, as Great American Knitting Mills
- Founders: Fritz S. Stern; Fritz Bendheim; J. Kuglemanin
- Headquarters: Burlington, North Carolina, U.S.
- Products: Socks
- Parent: Gildan
- Website: www.goldtoe.com

Gold Toe Brands, Inc., is the third-largest United States–based producer of socks.

== History ==
Gold Toe was founded by Fritz S. Stern, Fritz Bendheim, and J. Kuglemanin in Bally, Pennsylvania, on September 18, 1919, under the name Great American Knitting Mills. In 1923, Rudolf Abrams, a cousin of Fritz Stern's wife, joined the company.

During the Great Depression, Gold Toe began manufacturing men's socks from high-quality Irish linen, making them resistant to holes and fraying. In the 1930s, the company introduced gold acetate thread in the toes of its socks to make them visually distinctive on store shelves.

In 2002, the manufacturer changed its name to Gold Toe Brands Inc.

Gold Toe merged with competitor Moretz in 2006 to form Gold Toe Moretz. In 2011, Gildan acquired the company. The following year, they partnered with the advertising agency, DeVito/Verdi, to “revitalize and contemporize” the brand.

== Operations ==
The company's headquarters are in Burlington, North Carolina, with executive headquarters in New York City. Gold Toe Brands, Inc. has shifted much of its manufacturing to China, particularly the Zhejiang province.

Vice-President Trish McHale aimed to create affordable socks primarily for men. Although its primary market is men's dress socks, Gold Toe Brands has expanded into other areas of the sock market. In 1983, it added a line of women's socks; in 1986, it began producing boys' socks. In 1992, the brand started making women's tights.

Gold Toe produces 140 million pairs of socks annually and is on the American Podiatric Medical Association's approved list of brands for foot health.

== See also ==
- List of sock manufacturers
