= Oxxford Clothes =

Manufacturer of men's clothing

- Type: Private
- Industry: Tailoring
- Founded: 1916
- Founder: Jacob and Louis Weinberg
- Headquarters: Chicago, Illinois, United States
- Website: www.oxxfordclothes.com

Oxxford Clothes is a luxury men's suit and sport coat manufacturer based in Chicago, Illinois. Individualized Apparel Group currently owns the brand. Forbes magazine has rated Oxxford as the best American-made suit. Oxxford Clothes was called "the quintessential American suit maker" by Robb Report.

== History ==
Oxxford Clothes was founded in 1916 by Jacob and Louise Weinberg. The misspelling of "Oxford" was intentional. Spencer Hays bought the company in 1994. In 2016 Oxxford sold its historic building in Chicago's West Loop on Van Buren Street, and moved to the Southwest Side on Archer Avenue near Midway Airport. Following the move, Oxxford partnered with Richard Bennett Custom Tailors in the Loop for client fittings. Oxxford Clothes currently produces nearly 8,000 suits per year, far less than the 35,000 suits Oxxford produced annually in the 1980s.

== See also ==
- Hardwick Clothes
- Paul Stuart
- J. Press
- Hartmarx
- Henry Poole & Co
- Ozwald Boateng
- Timothy Everest
- Hardy Amies Ltd
- Gieves & Hawkes
- Richard James
- Joseph Abboud
