= Daniel Garrett =

British architect

Daniel Garrett (died 1753) was a British architect who worked on the Burlington Estate, Culloden Tower, Raby Castle, and Banqueting House.

== History ==
Garrett started as a clerk of works, then in 1735 set up his own practice in the North of England. He worked on The Mausoleum, Castle Howard, originally designed by Nicholas Hawksmoor, from 1737 to 1742, as well as streets on the Burlington Estate, such as Savile Row and on Horton Hall in Northamptonshire until 1753.

He wrote the first book on farm-buildings, Designs and Estimates of Farm-Houses, etc. in 1747.

== Style ==
He is thought to have been influenced by Richard Boyle, 3rd Earl of Burlington, his patron. He also used Rococo plasterwork, and some Gothic details in buildings such as Hylton Castle and Gibside Banqueting House in 1751.
