= Henry Herbert Tailors =

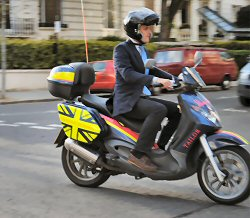
- Henry Herbert Tailors scooter
- Company type: Private
- Industry: Tailoring
- Founded: 2008; 18 years ago in Savile Row
- Headquarters: London, United Kingdom
- Website: henryherbert.com

Henry Herbert Tailors is a tailoring company based in London, England. They produce bespoke shirt and suits and provide fitting and delivery by scooter.

== History ==
Henry Herbert was founded in 2008 by Charlie Baker-Collingwood, the former Publisher of Diplo magazine and Managing Editor of Monocle magazine. With shirt making experience, a Vespa scooter and living in London he combined all three to create the Savile Row by Scooter service. The company today operates from No 9-10 Savile Row. The company's scooters are painted in various suit fabrics.
