= Richard James (tailor) =

Bespoke Savile Row tailors and menswear company

Coordinates: 51.5113256°N 0.1409355°W

- Type: Private
- Industry: Tailoring
- Website: https://www.richard-james.com

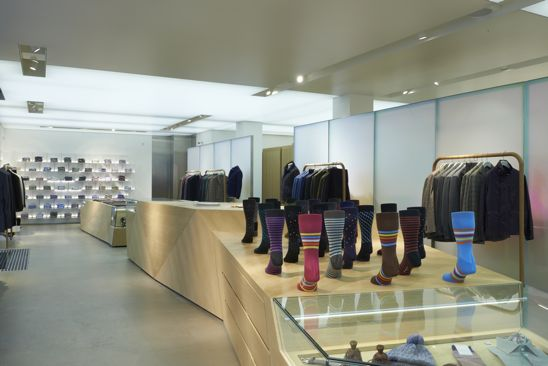
Interior of the flagship Richard James store at 29 Savile Row, London W1S 2EY

Richard James is a bespoke Savile Row tailors and contemporary menswear company. It was founded in 1992 by designer Richard James, a graduate of Brighton College of Art and a former buyer for the London boutique Browns, and his business partner Sean Dixon. The Creative Director is Toby Lamb, a graduate of Central Saint Martins. Richard James has won both the British Fashion Council's Menswear Designer of the Year and Bespoke Designer of the Year awards.

== History ==
The first of the "new establishment" or "new bespoke movement" of Savile Row - the more fashion-oriented wave of tailors who moved onto the street in the nineties - Richard James is credited by The Standard as having done much to revitalise its reputation and fortunes as a centre of quality, handcrafted tailoring.

Clients have included Mark Ronson, David Beckham, Sir Elton John, Sir Mick Jagger, Sir Paul McCartney, Stormzy and Prince William.

Richard James is a founding member of the Savile Row Bespoke Association, the trade organisation that represents bespoke tailoring on Savile Row, but Richard James' fashion-led approach, marketing techniques and introduction of Saturday opening to Savile Row were initially met with concern by some of the street's established tailors. One early supporter of Richard James, however, was British couturier Hardy Amies , who opened his own business on Savile Row in 1946.

Richard James now has two shops on Savile Row, one of which is home to its bespoke and made-to-measure tailoring, and a flagship store in New York. The company's ready-to-wear collections are also sold worldwide through stockists such as Harrods and Selfridges.

== House style ==
Richard James's tailoring has always centred on what has become known in the style press as its 'modern classic' style: one or two-button single-breasted suits with slightly longer, more waisted jackets, incorporating deep side vents and a slightly higher armhole to give a slim, definitive silhouette. The overall design philosophy is to produce classic clothing while experimenting with fabrics and making bold use of pattern and colour. The British fashion writer and academic Colin McDowell has described James as being 'the best colourist working in menswear in London today'.

== Collaborations ==
Throughout its history, Richard James has collaborated with a number of brands and individuals, including SpongeBob SquarePants, Elton John, Spencer Tunick, Condor Cycles, Umbro, Tretorn and Mango.

== Timeline ==
1992 The first Richard James shop opens at 37a Savile Row. Richard James's arrival is noticed by Nick Sullivan in British Esquire magazine: "There is an odd atmosphere these days in Savile Row. Nothing tangible, you understand. But from time to time, people stop to peer with uncertainty, with incomprehension, even with vague horror through the plate glass window of No. 37a. There's a new boy on The Row and he's causing quite a stir."

1995 The Sunday Telegraph reveals that Queen Elizabeth II's cousin David Linley is measured for his Richard James suits astride his motorcycle. Richard James moves to new, 2,000 square feet premises at 31 Savile Row.

1996 Richard James's 'suicide' cinema advertisement, which shows a Richard James attired man throwing himself off the top of a building, is banned.

1996 Richard James is awarded the Evening Standard's Eros Award as Retailer of the Year. Richard James is profiled in a cover feature on British design and style in the Cool Britannia edition of Vanity Fair.

1998' Dustin Hoffman and Robert De Niro wear Richard James camouflage suits on the cover of George.

2000 Richard James moves to 29 Savile Row, the largest premises on the street, which becomes its flagship shop, design studio and showroom.

2001 Richard James receives the British Fashion Council's Menswear Designer of the Year award, as well as Menswear Designer of the Year at GQ's Men of the Year Awards. The company also supplies all of the suits worn by its customer Hugh Grant in Bridget Jones's Diary.

2004 Richard James launches its trainers in conjunction with Tretorn. Richard James is one of the founding members of the Savile Row Bespoke Association, which is formed to promote and protect the traditions of bespoke tailoring on Savile Row.

2006 Central Saint Martins graduate Toby Lamb is appointed Design & Brand Director.

2007 Richard James opens another shop, Richard James Bespoke, opposite its Savile Row flagship shop, which is dedicated to bespoke tailoring.

2008 Richard James wins Best Advertising Campaign for Autumn/Winter '07 at the Wallpaper Magazine Design Awards. Richard James is the inaugural winner of the Bespoke Designer of the Year award at the British Fashion Council Awards.

2010 Richard James launches Mayfair, its contemporary entry level line, which is made available through John Lewis (department store) in the UK and Barneys New York in the USA.

2011 Richard James enters ecommerce with the launch of its global online shop. Richard James launches a capsule collection in collaboration with SpongeBob SquarePants. In conjunction with Swarovski, Richard James produces the wardrobe for Sir Elton John's The Million Dollar Piano shows at Caesars Palace in Las Vegas.

2012 Richard James celebrates its twentieth birthday and shows its Spring/Summer '13 collection at London Collections: Men, the British Fashion Council's inaugural menswear-specific fashion week.

2013 Richard James unveils its refurbished flagship store at 29 Savile Row.

2014 Richard James relaunches its Savile Row eau de toilette.

2017 Richard James unveils its Autumn/Winter '17 Camofleur collection in January during London Fashion Week Men's. Real estate developer and film producer Charles S. Cohen takes a majority stake in Richard James and assumes the role of chairman. Richard James Bespoke expands upstairs at 19 Clifford Street and now boasts two floors and 150 m2 devoted to bespoke and made-to-measure tailoring. Prince William, a client of the tailor, wore a Richard James suit for the cover of British GQ's July 2017 issue, having stipulated that he would wear only his own clothes for the shoot.

2018 Richard James the man is made an OBE (Order of the British Empire) in the New Year Honours list for services to fashion. Richard James crosses the Atlantic and opens its first New York store at 461 Park Avenue.

2019 To celebrate the release of the Elton John biopic Rocketman, Richard James displays some of the special pieces it has made for the star at its Savile Row and Park Avenue, New York stores.

2020 All-round changes at the top as Richard James the man steps back from a full-time role on Savile Row and puts his Mayfair penthouse on the market.

2021 The Savile Row store's art programme is inaugurated with an exhibition by Jamie Fitzpatrick.

2022 Richard James joins names from the worlds of tailoring and fashion to raise money for Crisis (charity) with the Pop-up at the Cop Shop sale at the old West End Central Police Station on Savile Row.

2023 The Clifford Street store in London undergoes a complete redesign and reopens as the multi-faceted Richard James House.

2026 Richard James collaborates with Mango to produce a capsule collection of contemporary tailoring. Richard James dresses Stanley Tucci's character, Nigel Kipling, in The Devil Wears Prada 2.
