= Timothy Everest =

Welsh fashion designer (born 1961)

Timothy Everest MBE
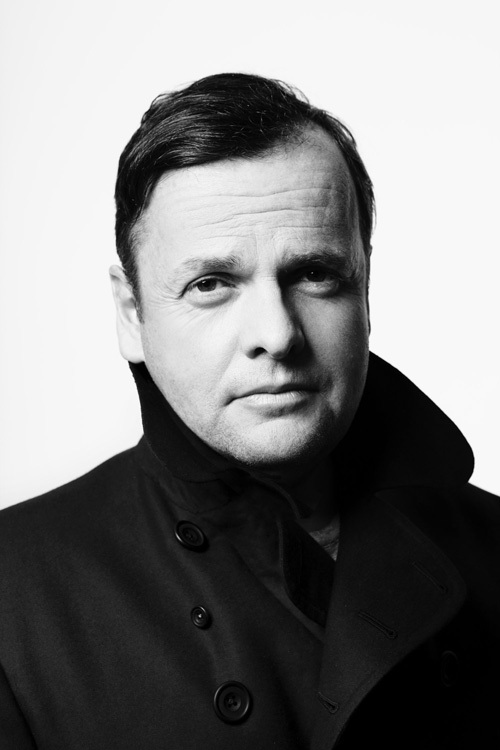
- Bespoke Tailoring
- Born: March 1961 (age 65); Dagenham, England
- Occupation: Bespoke tailor
- Known for: New Bespoke Movement
- Label: Grey Flannel / MbE www.greyflannel.co.uk www.mbe.studio

Timothy Charles Peto Everest MBE (born March 1961) is a Welsh tailor and fashion designer. He moved to London in his early twenties to work with the Savile Row tailor Tommy Nutter. He then became one of the leaders of the New Bespoke Movement, which brought designer attitudes to the traditional skills of Savile Row tailoring.

Everest had been running his own tailoring business in the East End of London since 1989. In 2017 Timothy Everest announced he would leave the company.

== Early life ==
Everest was born in Southampton but brought up in Haverford West; most of his family remain in the area of Wales. His parents were restaurateurs. He had aspired to become a race car driver. But, his ambition unfulfilled, he took a job with his uncle when he was 17 at Hepworths, Milford Haven; a high street tailor that would form the foundation of the Next retail empire. In the early 1980s, he became interested in the club scene, often driving to London, where he mixed with New Romantics such as Boy George at The Blitz; a trendy London nightclub run by Steve Strange of the group Visage.

Determined to become part of the fashion industry, but unable to make a breakthrough, Everest decided to use his knowledge of tailoring to his advantage. He answered an advertisement placed in the London Evening Standard, in 1982, by Tommy Nutter: "Boy wanted in Savile Row". He pestered Nutter for weeks, until he was given the job. Nutter's client base included rock stars, celebrities, politicians and businessmen; he famously dressed The Beatles and The Stone. Everest also mixed with future celebrities of the fashion world. John Galliano, who had been studying at the Central Saint Martins College of Art and Design, passed on some design skills to Everest, while on work placement with Nutter. Everest met his future wife Catherine at this time, while she was also working with Nutter. The couple have two daughters. Everest's time under Nutter, a Savile Row revolutionary in the 1960s, inspired him to experiment with tone and pattern in his own designs. In 1986, after nearly five years as Nutter's apprentice, Everest was persuaded to move on to work for Malcolm Levene. He had become disillusioned with Savile Row, particularly with its lack of appreciation for Nutter's more modern approach. Everest found that working with Levene, a small menswear retailer based away from Savile Row, on Chiltern Street, provided a welcome change. During Everest's first year there, Levene's turnover doubled.

== Career ==
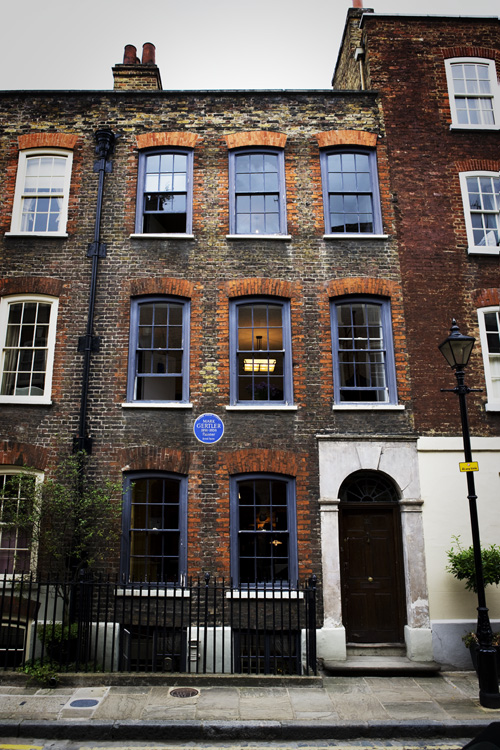
Timothy Everest's Spitalfields atelier

=== Setting out on his own ===
Leaving Levene in the late 1980s to become a freelance stylist in television advertising, MTV and film, Everest began styling bands and pop stars such as George Michael. He recognised a shift in perception of the male fashion industry; men had become more label conscious. This had coincided with the increased awareness of top-end fashion designers, like Hugo Boss and Armani, highlighted by men's lifestyle magazines such as Arena and The Face. He said, "I thought that if we could demystify bespoke tailoring and make it more accessible, as well as really understanding what was going on in ready-to-wear fashion and being directional with it, there was possibly a market there." Having decided to create the Timothy Everest brand as an alternative to 'designer' ready-to-wear, he searched for a suitable location away from "the stuffiness of Savile Row". Everest opened his first premises in 1989; in Princelet Street, Spitalfields, just outside the City of London, in the East End. He said, "We started in one room of a house. We had one rail with four garments on and a telephone, no chairs, no furniture." To begin with, business was slow. Moving premises in 1993, he chose a three-storey, early Georgian townhouse (built in 1724), just north of Old Spitalfields Market in nearby Elder Street – the former home of artist Mark Gertler (1891–1939) – converting it to an atelier over seven weeks. He dressed Tom Cruise for the 1996 film Mission: Impossible. Cruise liked the suits so much that he kept them, and commissioned Everest to make him some more.

=== New Bespoke Movement ===
Everest became one of the "Cool Britannia" tailoring generation of the mid-1990s, identified by James Sherwood (author of Savile Row: The Master Tailors of British Bespoke) as having begun with the publication of Vanity Fair's "Cool Britania" issue in 1997. Sensing a change in consumer attitudes, away from the more traditional styling of Savile Row, he sought to revitalise bespoke suiting, which he believed had been in danger of disappearing. With contemporaries Ozwald Boateng and Richard James, he launched the New Bespoke Movement, which brought a fashion designer approach to Savile Row craftsmanship. He launched the brand's first ready-to-wear collection in 1999. His long-standing association with Marks and Spencer began that year. He dressed Tom Cruise again, for his reprised role in the 2000 film Mission: Impossible 2, and at the Oscars that year, when he also dressed Robin Williams and Burt Bacharach. By 2000, he had 3,500 bespoke clients. Everest joined DAKS Simpson as design consultant in May 2000. He was appointed to the board as Group Creative Director in 2002, leaving in 2003. One of the lines he designed for DAKS was an affordable suiting range aimed at teenagers, launched in August 2001; called DAKS E1, after the postal district of his atelier.

=== Bespoke casual ===
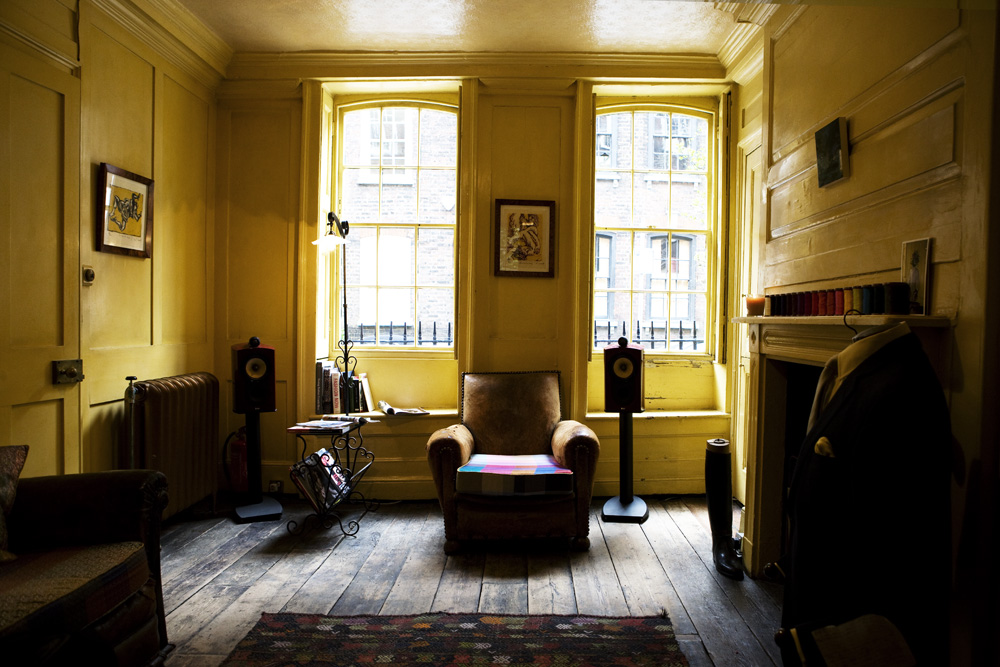
Inside Timothy Everest's Spitalfields atelier, ground floor

Everest is at the forefront of the bespoke casual movement which, as the name suggests, provides individually tailored casual clothing of Savile Row quality, including: casual shirts; smart-casual jackets; T-shirts; and jeans. In collaboration with Levi's in 2004, he designed a tailored-denim suit, sold in Japanese retailer Oki-Ni's stores. Everest designed a suit collection in 2004/05 in collaboration with Rocawear, the fashion clothing company founded by American hip hop artists Damon Dash and Jay-Z. The advertising campaign was fronted by Dash's friends Kevin Bacon and Naomi Campbell. He teamed up with British casual and sportswear designer Kim Jones during 2005 and 2006. The collaboration produced tailoring collections for four seasons that were shown on the catwalk at Paris fashion week. For his next collaboration, in 2006 Everest showed a limited collection of menswear with New York hair salon Bumble and bumble, including a fully bespoke denim line, which retailed at around US$1,000. Marketed as a 'destination location', the retail space on the store's 8th floor, in the fashionable Meatpacking District of Manhattan, also featured a barbershop, a café and a teahouse. In autumn 2007, the Timothy Everest ready-to-wear collection was available in shops for the first time, including Flannels, Liberty and John Lewis. The range included suits, shirts and trousers. He was costume designer for the 2008 film Mamma Mia!, dressing its stars, including Pierce Brosnan and Colin Firth. He opened a West End store in 2008, at Bruton Street, Mayfair, off Bond Street; less than five minutes walk from Savile Row. He has been a creative contributor and Sartorial Advisor to men's magazine The Rake since 2008.

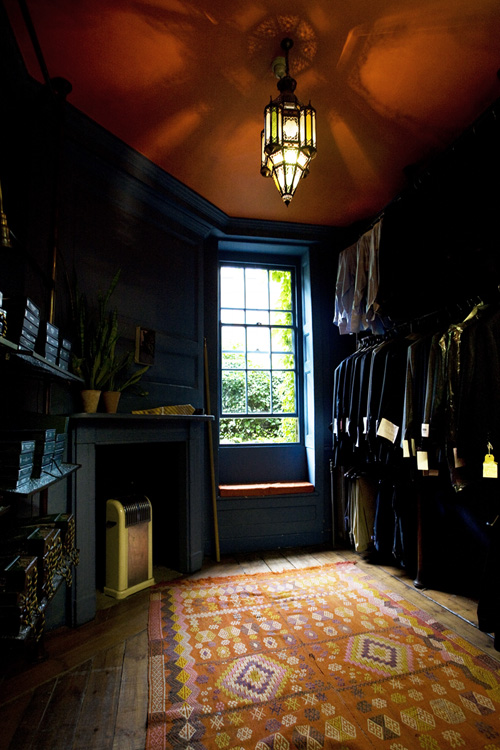
Inside Timothy Everest's Spitalfields atelier, upper floor

=== Bespoke active wear ===
A keen cyclist, in 2009 Everest collaborated with cyclewear brand Rapha to develop a bespoke suit that could be worn while cycling; what he called "bespoke active wear". Priced at £3,500, the three-piece suit was made of blended wool, using nanotechnology to repel water and dirt. It combined the functionality of classic cycling clothing with the elegance of bespoke tailoring. Its features included a high button fastening to keep the jacket closely fitted to the body, a lapel pocket for an MP3 player and pleats at the shoulders and center back to allow extra fabric when the rider was bent over the bicycle. The jacket design was incorporated into Rapha's ready-to-wear collection in 2010. In collaboration with bicycle saddle manufacturer Brooks England during 2010, he developed a cycling jacket; under Brooks' John Boultbee clothing label. The resulting 'Criterion Mk.1 cycling jacket', which used water and sweat-resistant materials, was shown at the Bread and Butter street and urban fashion fair, Berlin, in January 2011.

Everest was appointed Member of the Order of the British Empire in the 2010 New Year Honours for "services to the fashion industry". Having receiving the award from Queen Elizabeth at Buckingham Palace on Saint David's Day 2010, with his wife and two daughters watching, he described the award as a "great honour, not only for me but my business and all who have been involved". He is quoted as saying that he would like "to be remembered as someone who made people take British clothing seriously".

=== The brand ===
The Timothy Everest brand has three levels of tailoring. 'Bespoke' is aimed at young professionals with the means to purchase bespoke tailoring, but not necessarily the desire to visit Savile Row. Each customer is measured for an individual pattern to be hand-cut, from which their chosen cloth is cut and sewn by hand. Although still hand made, 'Made-to-measure' garments use existing 'house' patterns, adapted to the customer's measurements. The 'Ready-to-wear' collection is sold in-house, at Everest's Mayfair branch, and in Japan. Emphasising his Savile Row background, Everest said, "We are tailors who design, not designers who discovered tailoring".

== Marks and Spencer ==
UK department store retailer Debenhams' collaboration with designers, launched in 1993 under their Designers at Debenhams range, was a success. Hoping to recapture some of their lost market share, Marks and Spencer (M&S) asked Everest to review their menswear range. As Creative Consultant, he designed the Sartorial suiting line for their menswear collection. In October 2000, he designed the Autograph suiting line. Noting that the M&S range consisted of Italian-style suiting, he aimed to achieve a more 'British' look from the cut, fit and styling and by using different fabrics and colours. He also has responsibility for their Luxury collection. During M&S advertising campaigns, his designs for the Autograph range have been modelled by several British celebrities, including David Beckham, Bryan Ferry, Jimmy Carr, Martin Freeman, Bob Mortimer and Take That. In 2007, M&S were selected by The Football Association as "Official Tailor to the England football team" and Everest designed the team's official suits for the 2010 World Cup in South Africa.

== Clientele ==
Everest has, according to Vogue, dressed "some of the world's most famous people". He has clients worldwide and travels regularly for fittings in New York, Los Angeles and Japan. Closer to home, Everest's bespoke atelier in Spitalfields has a diverse client base that includes politicians (including British Prime Ministers past and present), and sports and Hollywood personalities. Of his suit worn to the Oscars, Tom Cruise commented, "Of course it fits; it's a Timothy Everest."

He has provided clothing on several films, including the first two Mission: Impossible films, Tube Tales, Eyes Wide Shut, Appaloosa, Atonement, The Accidental Husband and Mamma Mia!. Among his celebrity clients are Kevin Bacon, David Beckham, Matthew Broderick, Gordon Brown, Pierce Brosnan, David Cameron, Jarvis Cocker, Jeremy Irons, Jay-Z, Mick Jagger, and James McAvoy.

== See also ==
- Jean Patou
- Junior Apprentice
- List of Marks & Spencer brands
- Luke Scheybeler
- Tindersticks
