= Burlington Estate =

Coordinates: 51°30′37″N 0°08′29″W

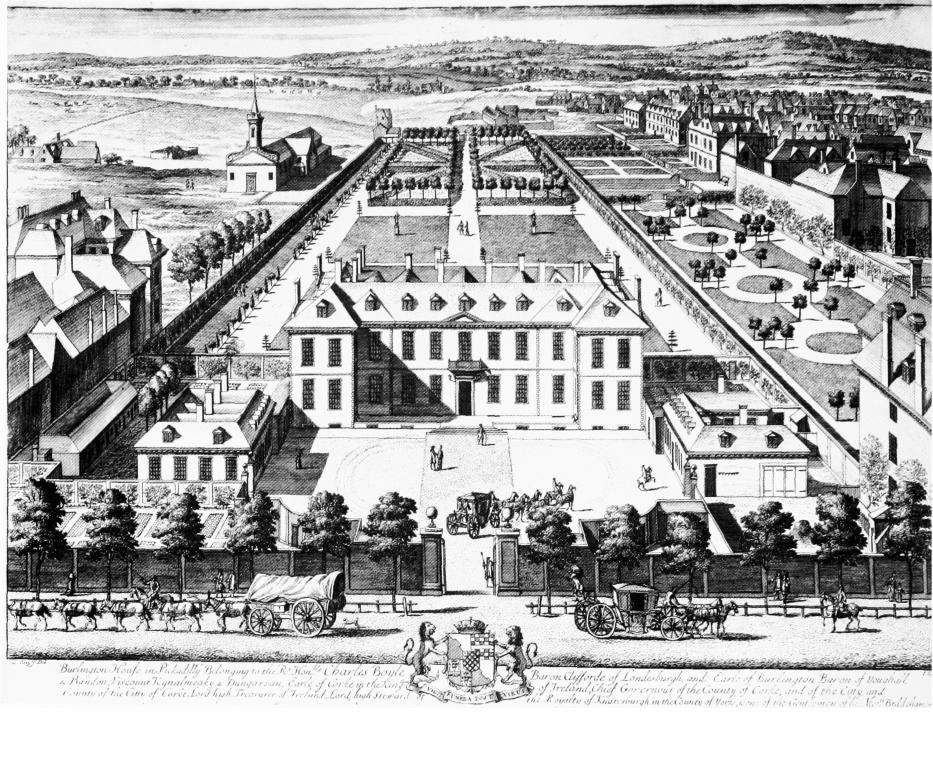
A view of Burlington House in the 1690s, forming the centrepiece of the Burlington Estate.

The Burlington Estate is an area in Mayfair to the north of Piccadilly in the West End of London, England. It was developed in the 18th century and owned by the Anglo-Irish Boyle dynasty, Earls of Burlington, in particular Richard, 3rd Earl of Burlington and 4th Earl of Cork (1694–1753).

Burlington House, which is on Piccadilly, was the estate's main house. It is now the home to the Royal Academy, the Geological Society of London, the Linnean Society of London, the Royal Astronomical Society, the Society of Antiquaries of London and the Royal Society of Chemistry.

Streets developed in the estate include Cork Street, now a centre for art galleries, and Savile Row, renowned for traditional (especially bespoke) gentleman's tailoring. The area has been known for its tailors since it was developed. Beau Brummell (1778–1840), who introduced the flamboyant form of gentleman's fashion in Regency London that became known as dandyism, patronised tailors in the area.

== See also ==
- Burlington Arcade
- Burlington Gardens
- Old Burlington Street
