= Savile Row =

Street in Mayfair, London, England

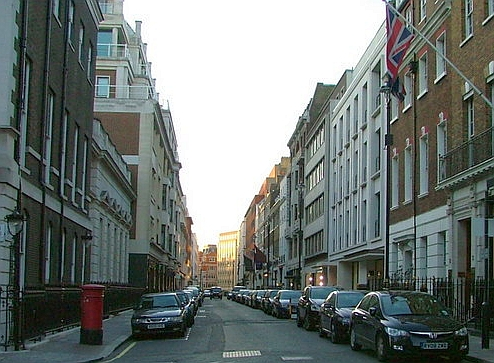
- Savile Row from Burlington Gardens

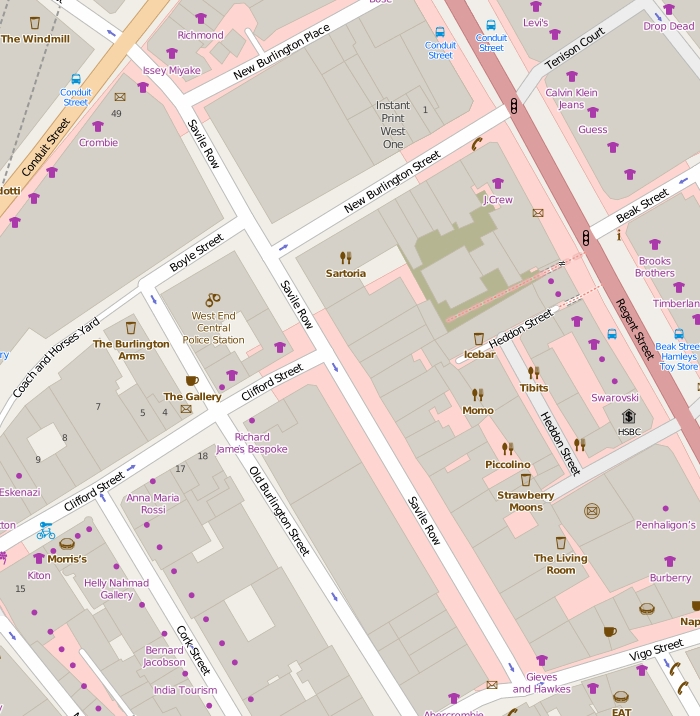
- Type: Street
- Owner: Norwegian Oil Fund
- Maintained by: Westminster City Council
- Location: London
- North: Conduit Street
- South: Vigo Street

Construction
- Completed: 1735

Other
- Designer: Henry Flitcroft
- Known for: Traditional bespoke tailoring for men

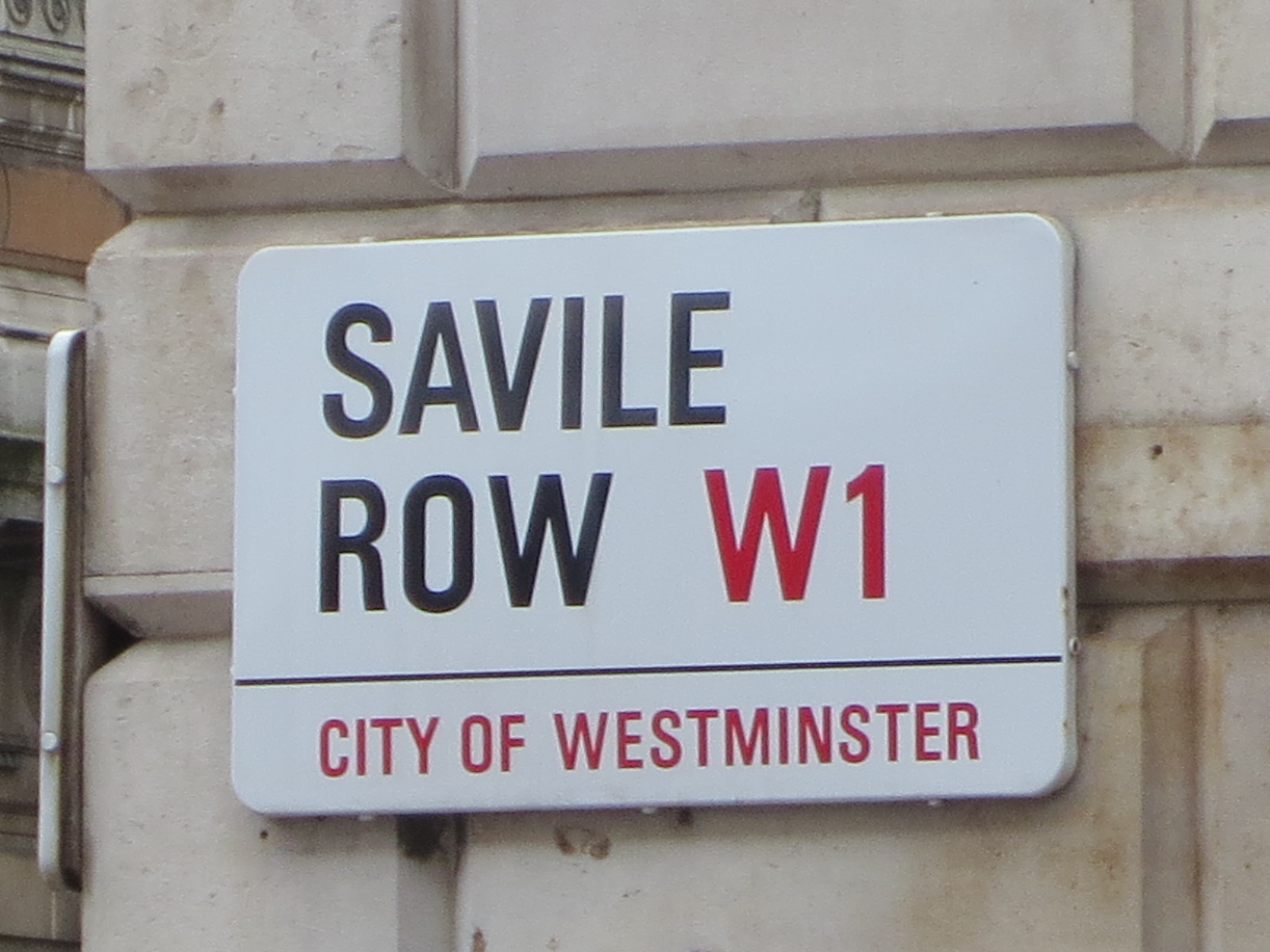

Savile Row (pronounced /ˌsævɪl ˈroʊ/) is a street in Mayfair, central London. Known principally for its traditional bespoke tailoring for men, the street has also accommodated the headquarters of the Royal Geographical Society at 1 Savile Row, where British explorations to Africa and the South Pole were planned; and more recently, the headquarters of the Beatles' Apple Corps business at 3 Savile Row, on whose roof the band gave its final live performance.

Originally named Savile Street, it was built between 1731 and 1735 as part of the development of the Burlington Estate. It was designed under the influence of Burlington's interpretation of Palladian architecture, known as "Burlingtonian". Henry Flitcroft, under the supervision of Daniel Garrett, appears to have been the main architect – though 1 and 22–23 Savile Row were designed by William Kent. Initially, the street was occupied mainly by military officers and their wives; later William Pitt the Younger and Irish-born playwright and MP Richard Brinsley Sheridan were residents.

Tailors started doing business in the area in the late 18th century; first in Cork Street, about 1790, then by 1803 in Savile Row itself. In 1846, Henry Poole, later credited as the creator of the dinner jacket, opened an entrance to Savile Row from his tailoring premises in Old Burlington Street. Founded in 1849 by Henry Huntsman, H. Huntsman & Sons moved to No. 11 Savile Row with the ending of the war in 1919. During the First World War, Huntsman's was a tailor to the military, producing dress uniforms for British officers. In 1969, Nutters of Savile Row modernised the style and approach of traditional Savile Row tailoring; a modernisation that continued into the 1990s with the "New Bespoke Movement", involving the designers Richard James, Ozwald Boateng, and Timothy Everest. The term "bespoke" as applied to fine tailoring is understood to have originated in Savile Row, and came to mean a suit cut and made by hand.

Savile Row runs parallel to Regent Street between Conduit Street at the northern end and Vigo Street with Burlington Gardens at the southern. Linking roads include New Burlington Street, Boyle Street, and Clifford Street. The freehold is owned by the Pollen Estate. In 2016 Westminster City Council commenced attempts to protect the street's tailoring heritage under the Savile Row SPA (Special Policy Area). In 2014, Norway's Oil Fund, the world's largest sovereign wealth fund, acquired a 57.8% interest in the Pollen Estate from The Church Commissioners. This includes properties in Mayfair, among which is Savile Row.

== History ==
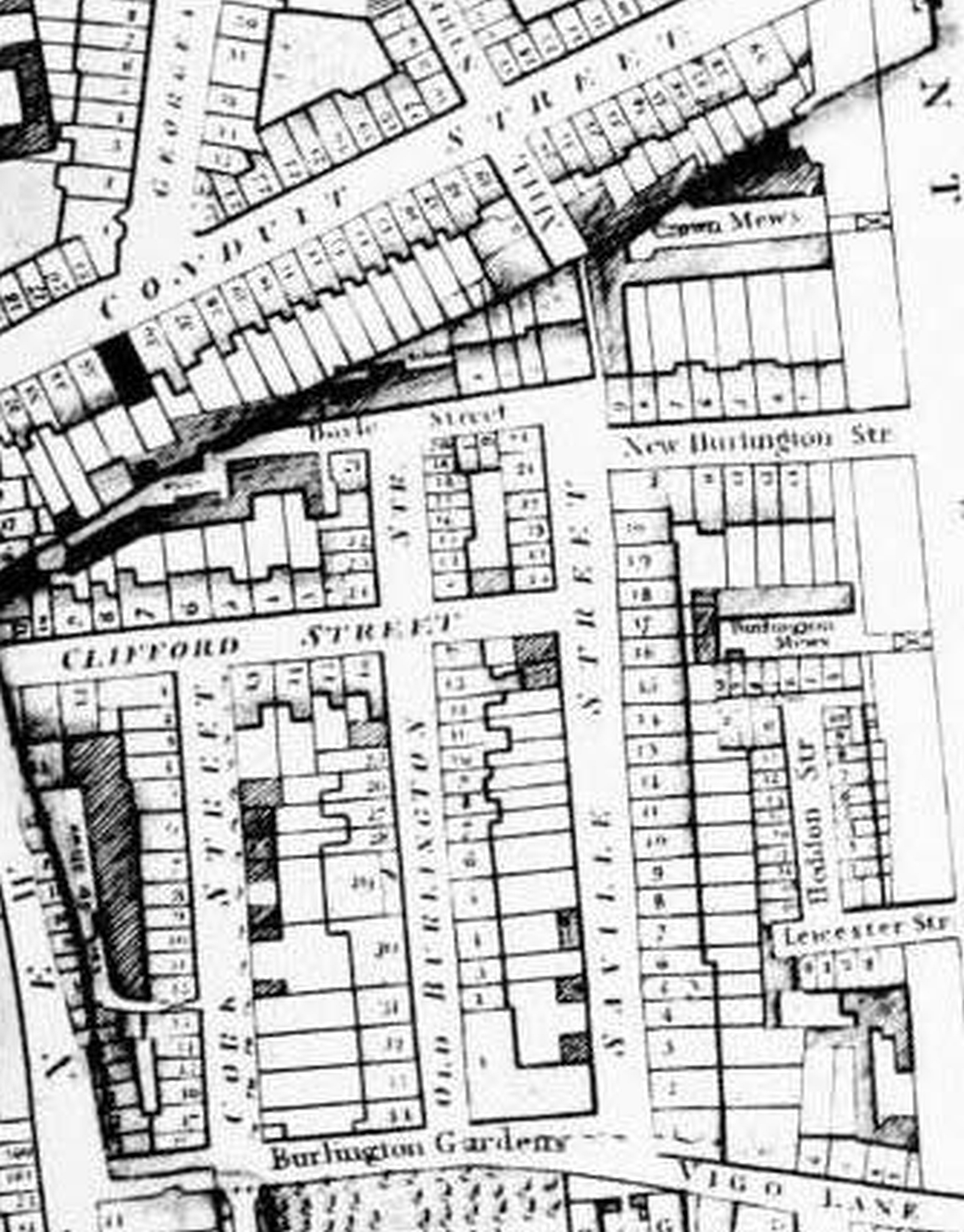
Savile Row (then called Saville Street) as shown on Richard Horwood's 1819 map of London

The first house in what would become Savile Row was "a fine House and Ground", built in 1674 on the site of what is now No. 1, and occupied by a series of nobles until it was demolished in 1730 in preparation for the laying out of the houses on the east of Savile Row in 1731. Savile Row was built between 1731 and 1735, on freehold land known as Ten Acres belonging to a merchant tailor, William Maddox, as part of the development of the Burlington Estate, and is named after Lady Dorothy Savile, wife of the 3rd Earl of Burlington. Maddox's land, consisting mainly of fruit and other trees covering what would become Savile Row and the streets around, some of which is still owned by his descendants as the Pollen Estate. When initially laid out – under the name Saville Street – Savile Row ran from Burlington Gardens (then Vigo Lane) to Boyle Street, with houses only on the east side, but in the 19th century, houses were built on the west side.

=== Nineteenth century ===
Initially, the street was occupied by military officers and their wives, along with politicians: William Pitt the Younger wrote letters from the street when it was called Savile Street; Irish-born playwright and MP, Richard Brinsley Sheridan lived at 14 Savile Row from 1813–1816, till his death. Jules Verne had Phileas Fogg, his lead character in Around the World in Eighty Days, live at 7 Savile Row – a "fashionable address" and "the former home of Sheridan". It may have been the affluent and influential nature of the residents of Savile Row that first attracted dealers in luxury goods to the area.

Tailors started to take premises around Savile Row in the late 18th century, first in Cork Street, about 1790, then by 1803 in Savile Row itself. In 1846, Henry Poole, credited as creator of the dinner jacket or tuxedo, opened an entrance at 37 Savile Row from his late father's tailoring premises at 4 Old Burlington Street. As tailoring moved into the street, the house frontages were altered to bring natural light into the tailors' working area with the addition of glass frontages and lightwells. The houses have been much altered over time; the original Burlingtonian design has been mostly lost, though No. 14 still retains much of the original external features.

=== Royal Geographical Society ===
The Royal Geographical Society occupied No. 1 from 1870 to 1912, from where significant British exploration was planned, including into Asia, Africa, and the South Pole; and, according to the society, the address "became associated with adventure and travel". David Livingstone was laid out in state at the society's headquarters, before being buried in Westminster Abbey. In 1871, shortly after the Royal Geographical Society moved into Savile Row, so did the Savile Club; a gentlemen's club founded in 1868 as the New Club, occupying rooms overlooking Trafalgar Square; it changed to its current name during its residence at 12 Savile Row, retaining the name when it moved in 1882 to premises in Piccadilly.

=== Twentieth century ===
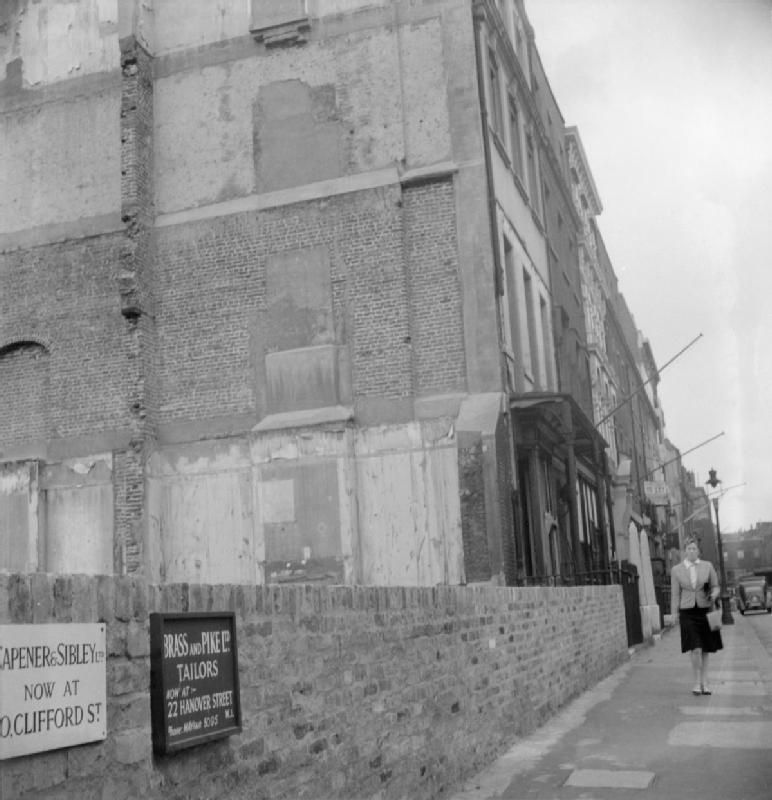
Bomb damage in Savile Row, 1944

Savile Row was extended to Conduit Street in 1937–38, and by 1939, the Metropolitan Police Station was constructed on the corner of Boyle Street. This police station was damaged in another German bombing raid in September 1940, during which the building opposite, No. 21a, was destroyed, as was No. 7 earlier that month. Fortress House, an eight-storey block of offices faced with Portland stone, was constructed at 23 Savile Row in 1949–50 and occupied by a series of government ministries, ending with a long period of occupation by English Heritage until 2006. It was demolished in 2009 and replaced by a new mixed-use development designed by Eric Parry, Architects.

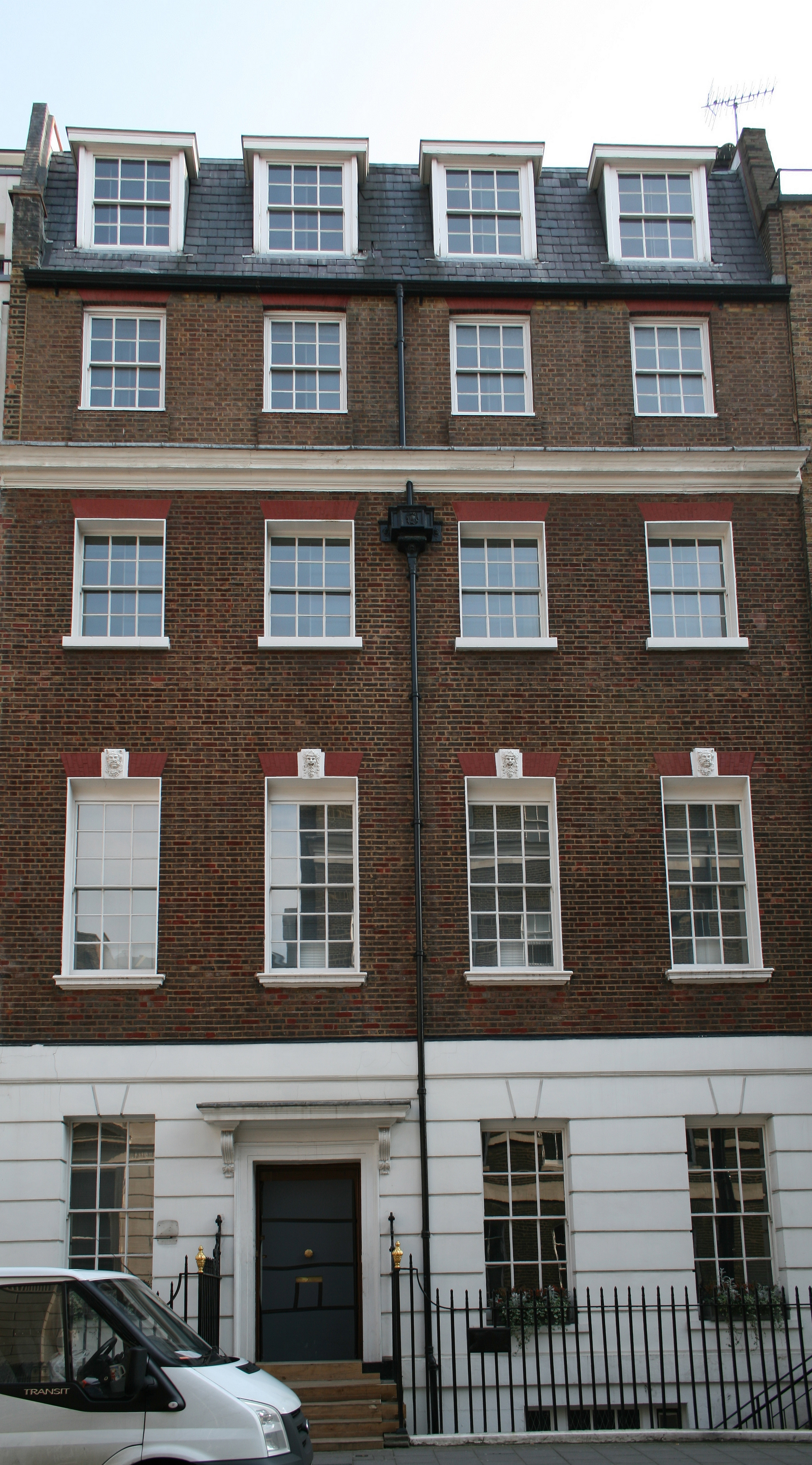
3 Savile Row, the Beatles' former Apple offices, 2007

In July 1968, the Beatles moved Apple Corps, their multimedia corporation, into 3 Savile Row. Apple purchased the building on 22 June for £500,000 (equivalent to £4,600,000 in 2025). A studio was built in the basement; though it was poorly designed, the Beatles recorded Let It Be there before a new studio was constructed in 1971 at an estimated cost of $1.5 million. Various artists, including Badfinger, Mary Hopkin, and Marc Bolan recorded in the basement studio until it closed in May 1975. The Beatles' final live performance, known as the "rooftop concert", was held on the roof of the building, on 30 January 1969, and was recorded for the documentary film Let It Be; the last words of the band, spoken by John Lennon as the police stopped the performance, were "I hope we passed the audition." On 11 May 2026, Apple Corps announced that the building is set to be reopened as an exhibition space, which will be opened to the public in 2027.

In 1969, Nutters of Savile Row modernised the style and approach of the traditional tailors; a modernisation which continued in the 1990s with the "New Bespoke Movement", involving the designers Richard James, Ozwald Boateng, and Timothy Everest. With increasing rents and criticisms from Giorgio Armani of falling behind the times, the number of tailors in Savile Row had declined to 19 in 2006, from approximately 40 in the 1950s. However, tailoring businesses have increased since 2006; as of October 2014, a local online directory listed 44 tailoring and clothing businesses on and around Savile Row. Some tailors had expressed concern in 2005 that an increase in commercial development in the area could lead to the death of the business locally, as tailors, many of whom traditionally manufacture their suits in their premises, in basement studios, could be priced out of the local property market. The Savile Row Bespoke Association was founded in 2004 to protect and develop bespoke tailoring as practised in Savile Row and the surrounding streets. The member tailors are typically required to put at least 50 hours of hand labour into each two-piece suit. The Association, along with the owners, the Pollen Estate, is working in partnership with Westminster Council to protect the street's tailoring heritage under the Savile Row SPA (Special Policy Area).

The Association objected to the American retailer Abercrombie & Fitch's plan to open a children's store at 3 Savile Row, concerned that chain stores entering the street would drive up rents, and took part in, what was then, a successful protest in 2012. However, A&F were allowed to move in and set up a children's store in 2013, although it closed by 2021.

Starting in 1946, 14 Savile Row was the home of Hardy Amies which changed ownership several times over the course of its history. In 2018, the company went into administration for a second time, and was attempting to sell its assets in 2019. The Savile Row store was closed in March 2019 and the space taken over by Hackett in June as its flagship store.

== Architecture ==
The original architectural plan for Savile Row is believed to have been drawn up by Colen Campbell, with Henry Flitcroft as the main architect of the street, under the supervision of Daniel Garrett; though 1 and 22–23 Savile Row were designed by William Kent, who moved into No. 2. These architects were all under the influence of Burlington's interpretation of Palladian architecture, known as "Burlingtonian", which was to have some influence on English architecture in the 16th century. As tailoring moved into the street, the house frontages were altered to bring natural light into the tailors' working area with the addition of glass frontages and light wells. The houses have been much altered over time; the original Burlingtonian design has been mostly lost, though No. 14 still retains much of the original external features. When the Royal Geographical Society occupied No. 1, they built a glass-roofed map-room in the courtyard, a small astronomical observatory on the roof, and a new portico – which may be the basis for the current appearance of the façade.

Several of the buildings on Savile Row are listed on the National Heritage List for England; 1 Savile Row (6A Vigo Street) is listed Grade II, 3 Savile Row is listed II*, 12, 12A and 13 are listed II as a group, 14 is listed Grade II*, 17 is listed Grade II, 16 is listed Grade II, and 11 is listed II*.

== Tailoring ==
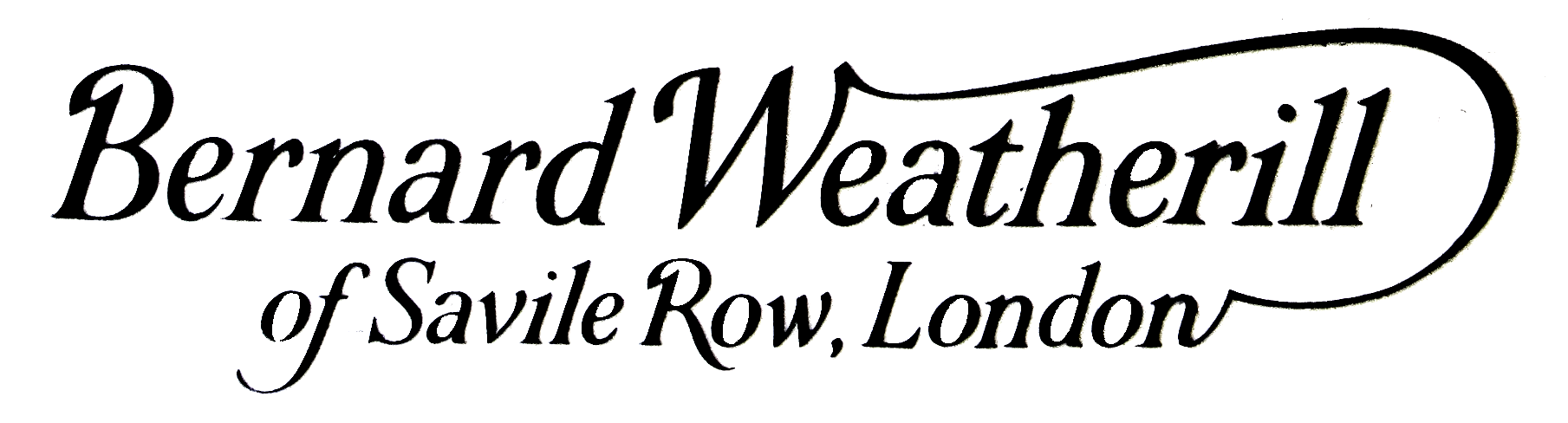
Company logo of Bernard Weatherill Ltd on 5 Savile Row

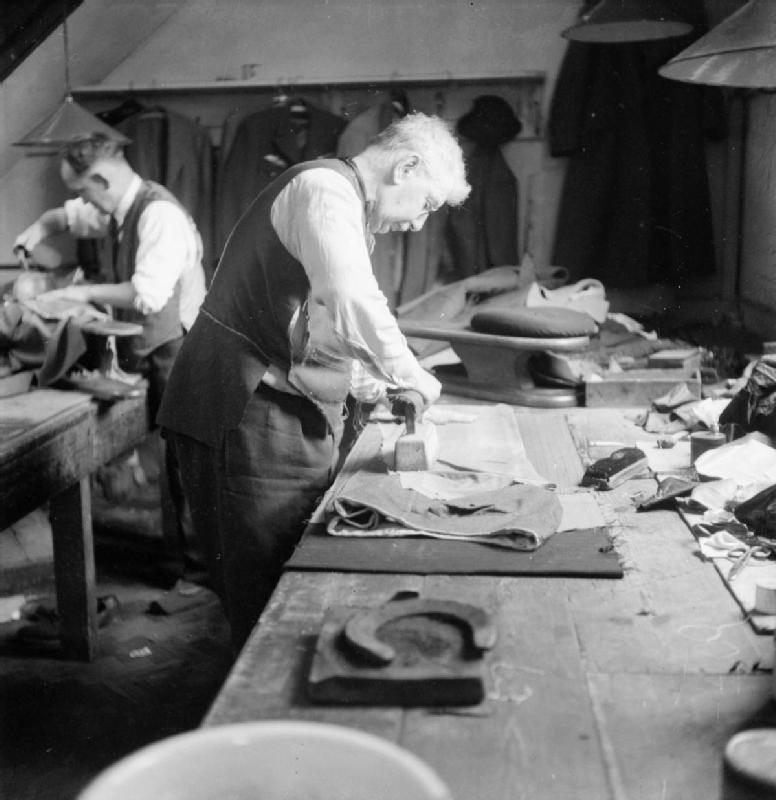
A tailor pressing a pair of trousers in the workroom of Henry Poole & Co in 1944

Savile Row's reputation is built on bespoke tailoring, where each suit is made to individually fit. The term "bespoke", which has an etymology developing from "to exclaim" through "discussed in advance" and is generally understood to mean "made to order", became associated with fine tailoring, with tailors claiming that the term has been in common use for tailoring since the 17th century. Savile Row tailors argue that "bespoke", in relation to tailoring, is understood to mean a suit cut and made by hand; however, after a ruling by the Advertising Standards Authority in 2008, the term may now also be applied to machine sewed garments, provided they are made-to-measure.

Customers of the "golden mile of tailoring" have included Lord Nelson, Napoleon III, Winston Churchill, and Charles III. Muhammad Ali Jinnah, the founder of Pakistan, used to order his suits from Savile Row. Although it is sometimes reported that Ian Fleming and his character James Bond bought suits in Savile Row, there is no evidence for this in the novels; both Fleming and the Bond film character wore suits designed by non-Savile Row tailors, in particular Anthony Sinclair of nearby Conduit Street.

Tailors, attracted by the affluent and influential nature of the residents of Savile Row, started to open businesses in the area in the late 18th century, first in Cork Street, about 1790, then by 1803 in Savile Row itself. None of those original tailors survive today, though Henry Poole & Co, who through Edward VII's patronage, helped make the street fashionable, still have a presence in Savile Row. Poole moved the company into 32 Savile Row in 1846, following the death of his father James Poole, and the company is now at No. 15. Henry Poole is credited as creator of the dinner jacket, when he made a smoking jacket for the young Edward VII in 1860.

Tailoring was softened in the early 20th century by Dutch tailor Frederick Scholte when he developed the English drape for the Duke of Windsor. Scholte's "dress soft" style was developed into the "London cut", the house style of Anderson & Sheppard, by Per Anderson, a protégé of Sholte. The "London cut" is a high small armhole with a generous upper sleeve that permits the jacket to remain close to the neck while freeing the arm to move with comfort.

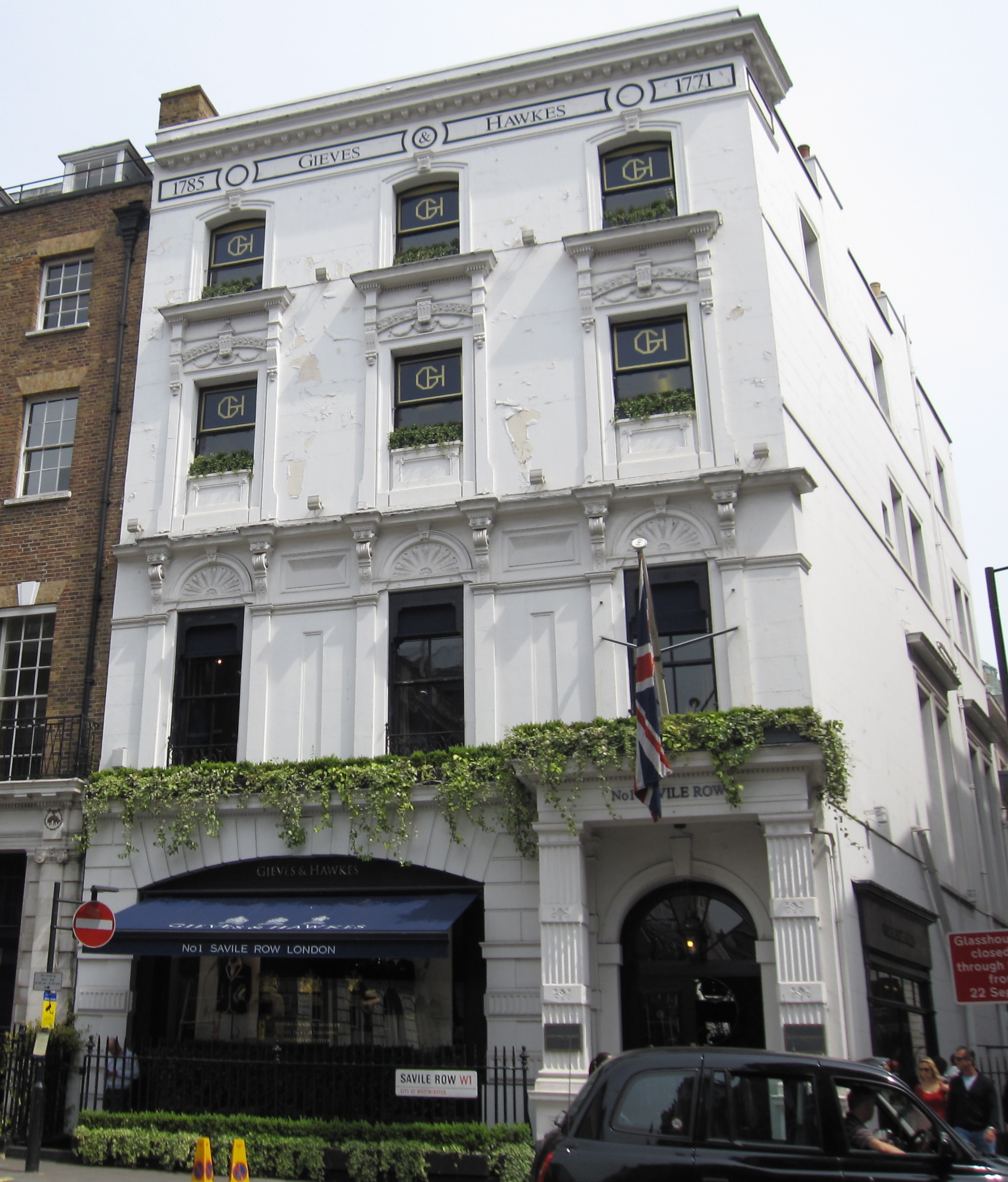
Gieves & Hawkes at 1 Savile Row

Though the reputation of tailoring on Savile Row is for bespoke suits, ready-to-wear clothes were introduced by Gieves & Hawkes, a company formed in 1974 by the merger of two separate businesses who both date from the late 19th century: Gieves, a Royal Navy tailor founded in Portsmouth; and Hawkes, a London-based cap-maker and tailor to the British Army. Hardy Amies Ltd further broadened the scope and appeal of tailoring in Savile Row: in 1961, he staged the first men's ready-to-wear catwalk shows, at the Ritz Hotel in London, he designed costumes for the 1966 England World Cup team, and for the 1968 film 2001: Space Odyssey, and dressed the Queen, designing the gown used for the Silver Jubilee portrait in 1977. Hardy Amies founded the company in 1946, converting the bombed out shell of No. 14. Amies sold the business to the Luxury Brands Group and retired in 2001, but it went into administration in 2008 when it was bought by Fung Capital. It went back into administration in 2018 but on this occasion no buyer was found and the House was closed.

Modernisation of tailoring continued in 1969 with Nutters of Savile Row. Nutters of Savile Row was opened on Valentine's Day 1969 by Tommy Nutter and Edward Sexton, who had worked together at Donaldson, Williamson & Ward. Financially backed by Cilla Black and Peter Brown of the Beatles Apple Corps, Nutters used bold window displays, created by the then unknown Simon Doonan; and clients included the Beatles, Mick Jagger, Elton John, and Andrew Lloyd Webber. Nutter left the company in 1976 and went to work at Kilgour. He died in 1992. However, Terry Haste, cutter at Tommy Nutter, continues with John Kent (holder of the Royal Warrant for the Duke of Edinburgh) nearby at 7 Sackville Street.

Modernisation had slowed by the early 1990s; Savile Row tailors were "struggling to find relevance with an audience that had grown increasingly disassociated". Three tailors, Ozwald Boateng, Timothy Everest (an apprentice of Nutter's), and Richard James, then became known for revitalising the bespoke style for the modern market—having each broken away independently from the Savile Row mould. Public relations professional Alison Hargreaves coined the term "New Bespoke Movement" to describe collectively the work of this "new generation" of tailors. Interest reached a peak in 1997 when the three were featured together in Vanity Fair. The newcomers altered their shop fronts and used marketing and publicity to their advantage; challenging the traditional Savile Row styling, they brought twists and "a fine sense of colour to bespoke suits." They were seen to "push the envelope of modern suit making and bespoke active wear, creating more contemporary silhouettes with bolder fabrics," and set out to attract celebrity clients, sell their clothing via supermarket chains, and attract wider national and international custom, raising the profile of their new tailoring style.

== Sources ==
- Anderson, Richard, (2009). Bespoke: Savile Row Ripped and Smoothed. Simon and Schuster. ISBN 1847378765
- Black, Barbara (2012). A Room of His Own: A Literary-Cultural Study of Victorian Clubland. Ohio University Press. ISBN 0821444352
- Bye, Elizabeth, (2010). Fashion Design. Berg.
- Doggett, Peter, (2010). You Never Give Me Your Money: The Beatles After the Breakup. Random House.
- Glinga, Werner, (1986). Legacy of Empire: A Journey Through British Society. Manchester University Press
- Hill, D. D., (2011). American Menswear: From the Civil War to the Twenty-First Century. Texas University Press
- King, P.S., (1928). Indication of Houses of Historical Interest in London: Volume 4. Jas. Truscott Press / London County Council
- Kingsford, Charles Lethbridge, (1925). The Early History of Piccadilly, Leicester Square, Soho, & Their Neighbourhood. London Topographical Society
- McDermott, Catherine, (2002). Made in Britain. Mitchell Beazley. ISBN 1840005459
- Miles, Barry (2001). The Beatles Diary Volume 1: The Beatles Years. London: Omnibus Press. ISBN 978-0-7119-8308-3.
- Mowl, Timothy, (2007). William Kent: Architect, Designer, Opportunist. Random House
- Musgrave, Eric, (2010). Sharp Suits. Anova Books
- Sheil, Bob, (2012). Manufacturing the Bespoke. John Wiley & Sons
- Sheppard, F.H.W., ed. (1963). "Cork Street and Savile Row Area: Savile Row". Survey of London: vol. 31 and 32, St James Westminster, part 2. London: London County Council
- Slenske, Michael, (2008). London Calling: Riding Around a British Tailor's Bespoke World. Best Life
- Steele, Valerie (2010). The Berg Companion to Fashion. Berg
- Tungate, Mark, (2008). Branded Male. Kogan Page Publishers
- Ben Weinreb, Christopher Hibbert (1983). The London Encyclopaedia. Macmillan
- Piet Schreuders, Adam Smith, Mark Lewisohn (30 June 2008). Beatles London: The Ultimate Guide to Over 400 Beatles Sites in and Around London. Anova Books
