= Henry Poole & Co =

British gentlemen's bespoke tailor

Coordinates: 51°30′40.09″N 0°8′25.9″W

Henry Poole and Company (Savile Row) Limited

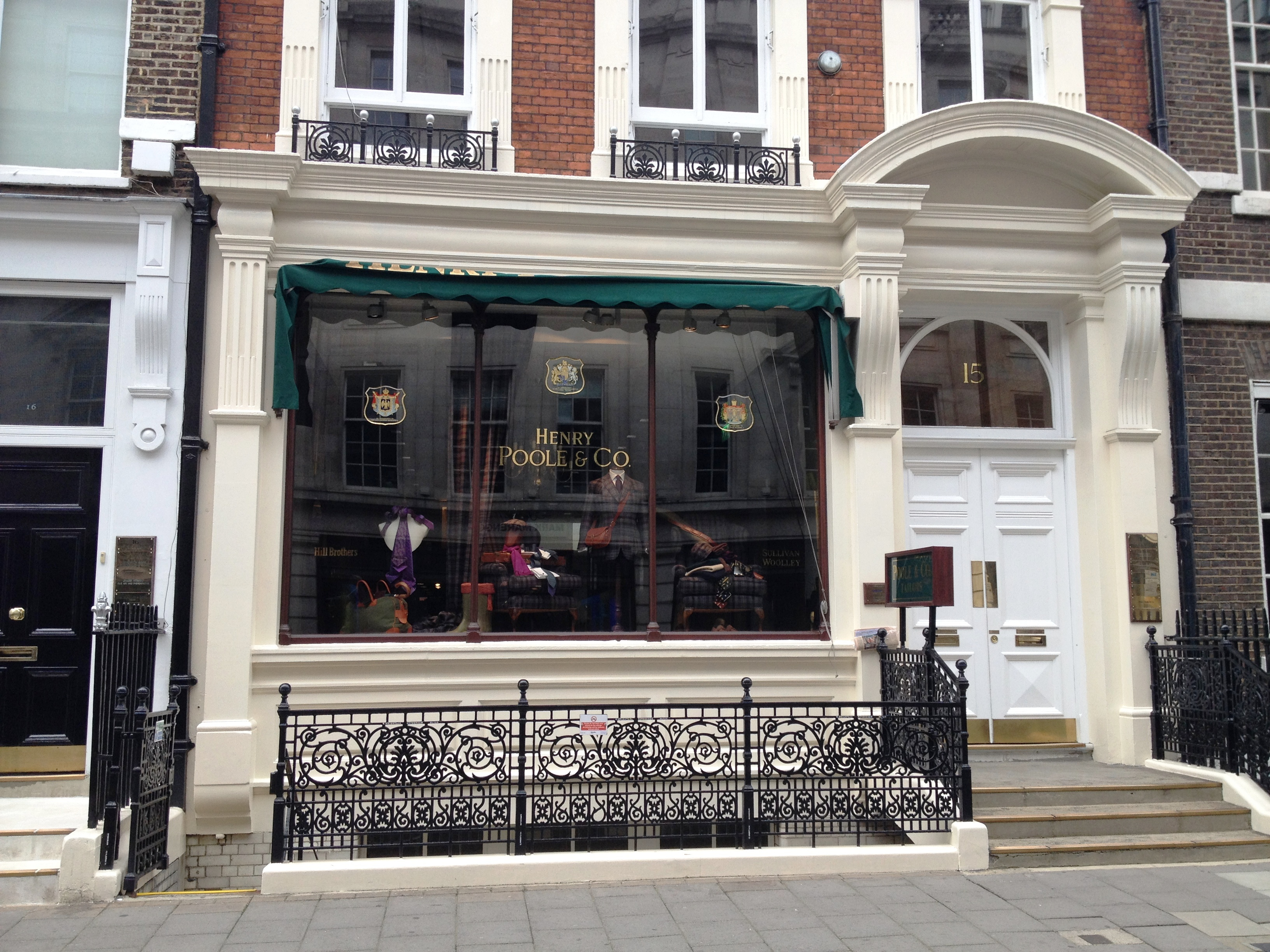
- Trade name: Henry Poole & Co.
- Company type: Private limited company
- Industry: Bespoke tailoring
- Founded: 1806; 220 years ago
- Founder: James Poole
- Headquarters: 15 Savile Row; London, England
- Key people: Simon Cundey (managing director)
- Products: Menswear
- Owner: Cundey family
- Website: henrypoole.com

Henry Poole & Co. is a British bespoke tailor located at 15 Savile Row in London, England. It is widely believed to have designed the first modern-style dinner jacket during the 1860s, according to specifications provided by the Prince of Wales (later Edward VII). The company has been called "the founding father of Savile Row".

== History ==
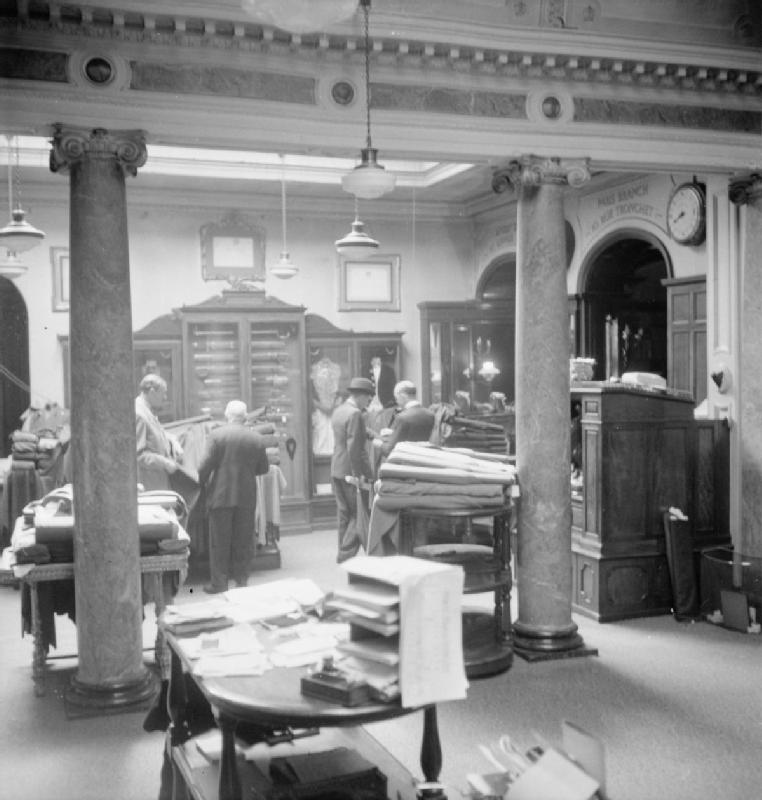
Customers examine the wares of Henry Poole and Co. in their 18th-century showroom on Savile Row (1944)

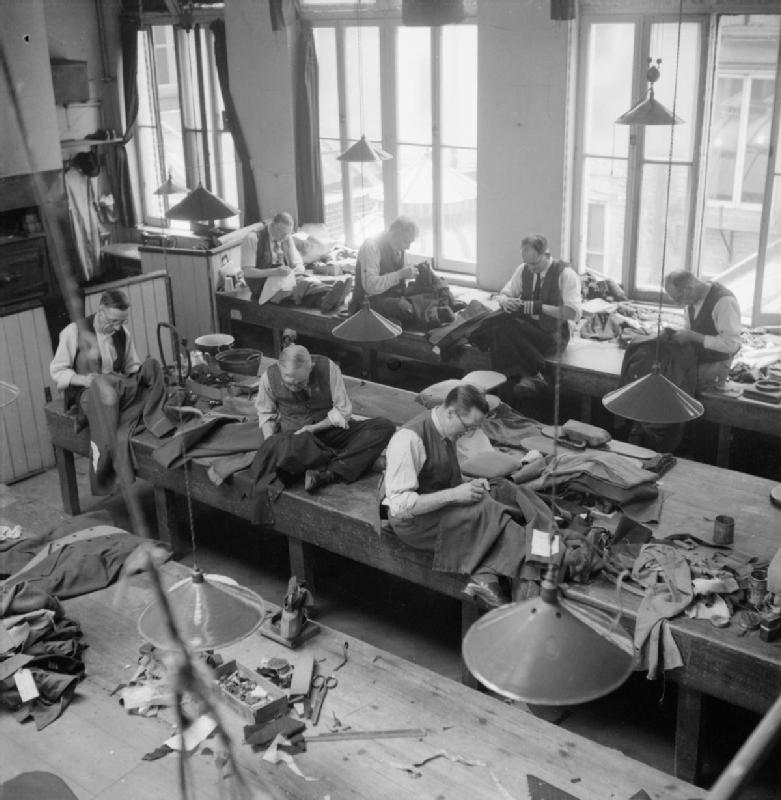
A view of the workroom at Henry Poole and Co., showing tailors at work on various types of jacket, including a naval officer's jacket, second from right on the rear row. The men are all sitting on the workbenches. (1944)

The business first opened in 1806 at Brunswick Square, originally specializing in military tailoring during the Napoleonic Wars. After the death of founder James Poole, it relocated to Savile Row in 1846. Henry Poole ran the business until his death in 1876, after which his cousin, Samuel Cundey (1823-1883), took over. Both are buried in Highgate Cemetery.

The company has remained in the control of the Cundey family through five generations. The current managing director, Simon Cundey, assumed this position after the passing of his father in August 2024.

The company holds royal warrants of appointment and supplies the Lord Chamberlain's office with court dress. Their livery department also created uniforms for the 200th anniversary of the Battle of Trafalgar.

== Origins of the tuxedo ==
In 1860, Henry Poole made a short evening or smoking jacket for the Prince of Wales to wear at informal dinner parties at Sandringham. In 1886, during a visit to London, the Prince invited James Potter of Tuxedo Park, New York, to spend a weekend at Sandringham House. He was advised that he could have a smoking jacket made by the Prince's tailor, Henry Poole & Co.

When Potter returned to New York, he wore this new smoking jacket at the Tuxedo Club. Fellow members quickly began having copies made for themselves, adopting the jacket as their informal uniform for club "stag" dinners. As a result, the jacket became known as a tuxedo (or tux) in the United States.

== See also ==
- Savile Row tailoring
