= Savile Row tailoring =

Bespoke tailoring in Mayfair, London

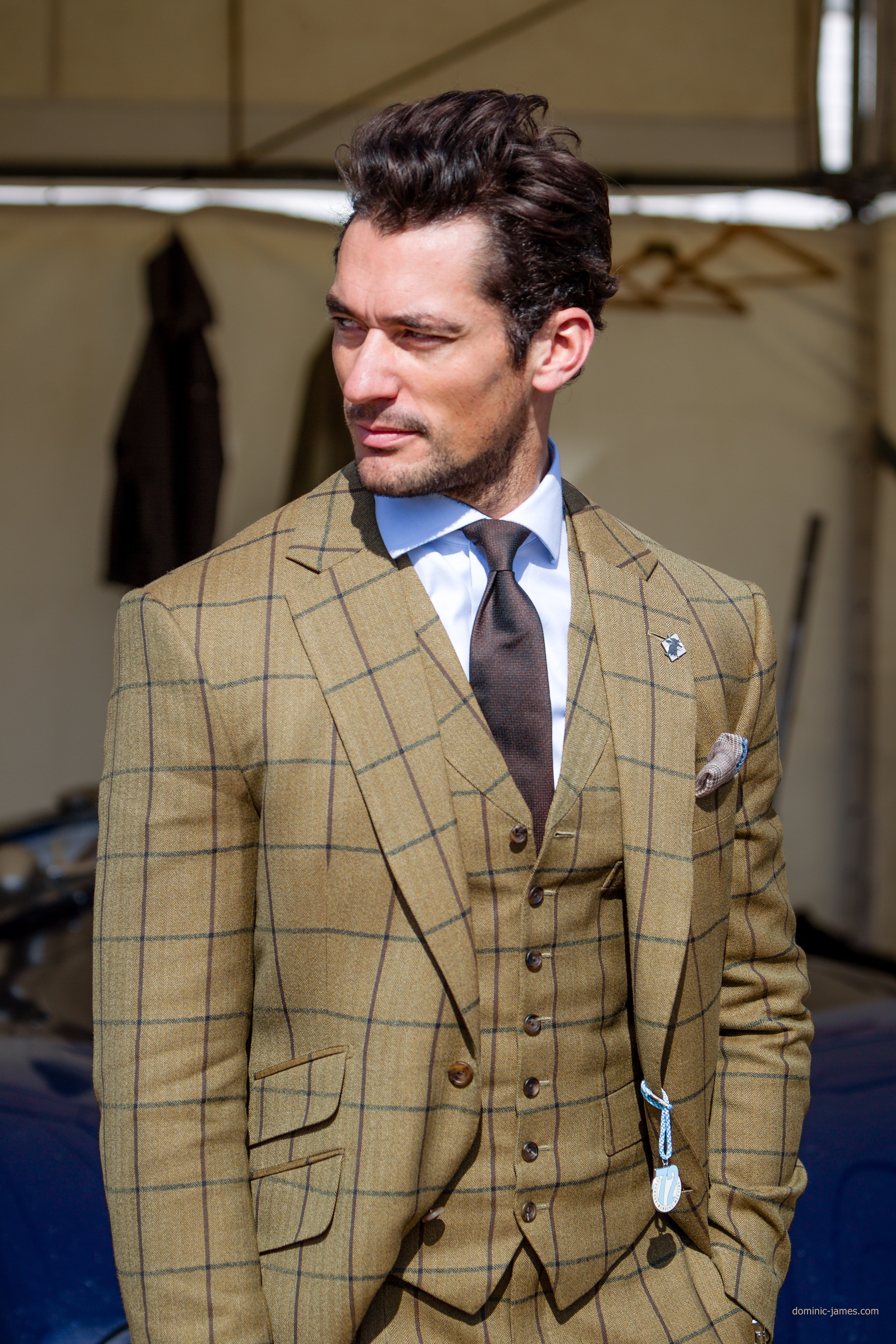
The model David Gandy wearing a bespoke suit by Henry Poole & Co (2014)

Savile Row tailoring is primarily men's bespoke tailoring that takes place on Savile Row and neighbouring streets in Mayfair, Central London. Historically, it catered almost exclusively to male clients, with bespoke tailoring for women emerging only in the late 20th and early 21st centuries. While a few Savile Row houses now offer bespoke tailoring for women, the street's reputation was established through menswear.

Although Savile Row is frequently used as a shorthand for British bespoke tailoring as a whole, the Row's tradition is more precisely understood as one branch of London's tailoring heritage — the West End style, centred on Mayfair. A distinct parallel tradition also developed in the City of London, serving the financial community of the Square Mile through tailors such as MacAngus and Wainwright and Alexander Boyd. Norton & Sons, for example, was established in 1821 explicitly as tailors to the gentlemen of the City of London, operating from Lombard Street before relocating to Savile Row in the 1860s.

In 1846, Henry Poole, credited as being the "Founder of Savile Row", opened an entrance to his tailoring premises at No. 32 Savile Row. The term bespoke is understood to have originated in Savile Row when cloth for a suit was said to "be spoken for" by individual customers. The short street has been termed the "golden mile of tailoring", where customers have included Charles III, Winston Churchill, Lord Nelson, Napoleon III, Muhammad Ali Jinnah, Laurence Olivier and Duke Ellington.

In 1969, Nutters of Savile Row modernised the style and approach of the traditional tailors – a modernisation that continued in the 1990s with the arrival of designers including: Richard James, Ozwald Boateng and Timothy Everest. This evolution has continued into the 21st century. Alexandra Wood, who established her business on Savile Row in 2008, has been described in coverage by The Times as part of a broader shift towards a more contemporary approach to bespoke menswear. With increasing rents, the number of tailoring businesses on Savile Row had declined to 19 by 2006. There were also criticisms from Giorgio Armani of falling behind the times. However, since the mid-2000s Savile Row has been enjoying a resurgence. A local online directory in October 2014 listed 44 tailoring and clothing businesses on or near Savile Row.

== History ==
While the first tailors moved onto Savile Row as early as 1806, the origins of its tailoring history can be traced back to the beginning of the 17th century. The story begins with a tailor called Robert Baker (RB), originally from Staplegrove in Somerset, who bought up land to the north west of Charing Cross with money made from the sale of Piccadills, a type of large broad collar. Working from "a poore little shop in ye Strand" RB and his wife Elizabeth started a business that pitched their trade to the rich, among which was Lady Cope. Quoting from a contemporary source: "By ye means of ye Ladie Cope, whose Taylor hee was, [RB] fell into a way of makinge Pickadillys ... for most of the Nobilitie and Gentrie". RB soon had "three score men att worke" and with the opening of a shopping arcade the New Exchange by King James I next door in 1609, business prospered. Indeed, so much so that by 1613, "poore Countrey Taylor" RB had bought land for £50 (2023 value £10,206), which was then open country, and built himself a comfortable new home near where the Lyric Theatre now stands on Shaftesbury Avenue.

Soon, RB's new residence gained the nickname "Pickadilly Hall" and with other properties being developed by him on that land, the nearest roadway also acquired the name "Pickadilly", which became modern-day Piccadilly. With his next property development, RB bought 22 acres of land nearby, including Golden Square, where many cloth merchants used to reside, and several streets in Soho where subcontracting tailors are traditionally based. The plot of land where Savile Row was eventually developed was originally called Ten Acre Close and "was created by the sale on 29 June 1622 of three adjacent parcels of ground, then all in St. Martin's in the Fields, to William Maddox, citizen and merchant tailor of London, by Richard Wilson of King's Lynn, gentleman." Ten acre close was part of 35 acres of undeveloped land bought by Maddox for £1,450 (2023 value £285,666), which now covers East Mayfair. This estate was handed down through Maddox's heirs for many generations, until it was passed to the Reverend George Pollen in 1764. As a result of this, the Pollen Estate still exists to this day, part-owned by Norway's Oil Fund since August 2014.

Tailoring has been associated with the Savile Row the area since the 19th century, when Beau Brummell, who epitomised the well-dressed man, patronised the tailors congregated on the Burlington Estate, notably around Cork Street, upon which John Levick in 1790 at No. 9 was among the first. As of 1806 there was still not a tailor on Savile Row itself, but businesses such as Davies & Son; Adeney & Boutroy; John Levick; Stultz, Meyer, Burghart and Davidson were colonising surrounding streets, including Clifford Street, Cork Street, Conduit Street, Sackville Street and Hanover Street. It is believed that the first tailors to actually work on the Row were Henry Poole and Company in 1846, when they turned the back entrance of their workshops at No. 32 Savile Row into the main entrance to their shop.

As the areas reputation grew there were more tailoring firms and tailors. Tailoring was known as a “sweated trade” that is with poor pay and conditions. Whilst the cutters were generally employed staff, the making tailors were self-employed, so-called journeymen, as they would seek work from firm to firm. The journeymen were paid for completed work against a “Time Log”. This was a schedule of time to complete tasks and with an hourly rate gave the price earned. There was a continuous tension from the tailors to increase the time or the rate to increase pay. There were many disputes, but in 1867 there was a major strike with some 2,500 tailors on strike affecting around 90 firms in Mayfair.

The tailors trade unions became more organised and in 1891 The Master Tailors established the Association of London Master Tailors (ALMT) to better coordinate their efforts to manage dispute resolution (The Savile Row Bespoke Association of the day, see below). The first President was Harry Hill (Hill Brothers) who would be succeeded by Howard Cundey (Henry Poole) in 1906 and William Cooling Lawrence (Cooling, Lawrence & Sons) in 1921 to 1937. William Cooling Lawrence would also chair the Joint Conciliation Board between the Masters and Tailors Trade Unions on pay and conditions from 1891 to 1937. Relations would improve with a fairer Time Log in 1891 and the ALMT would have to manage other crises over the decades including the impacts of the First World War and economic slumps. In 1912 the ALMT listed 169 member firms of Savile Row rating with a combined capacity for 1,500 sittings.

Working conditions were also problematic. Workshops in general were poor in terms of the working space and arrangements for personal hygiene. “Sittings” were provided for the tailors but they were literally just that, a space on the floor to work and ironing on boards resting on the knees. In 1903 Cooling, Lawrence and Sons completed rebuilding and extending their premises at 47 Maddox Street. They provided a modern working environment and ended the practice of “sittings” on the floor at the firm, providing raised work boards for all tailors. Other firms would also adopt the change shortly after including Henry Poole, Hill Bros, Meyer and Mortimer and Sandons.

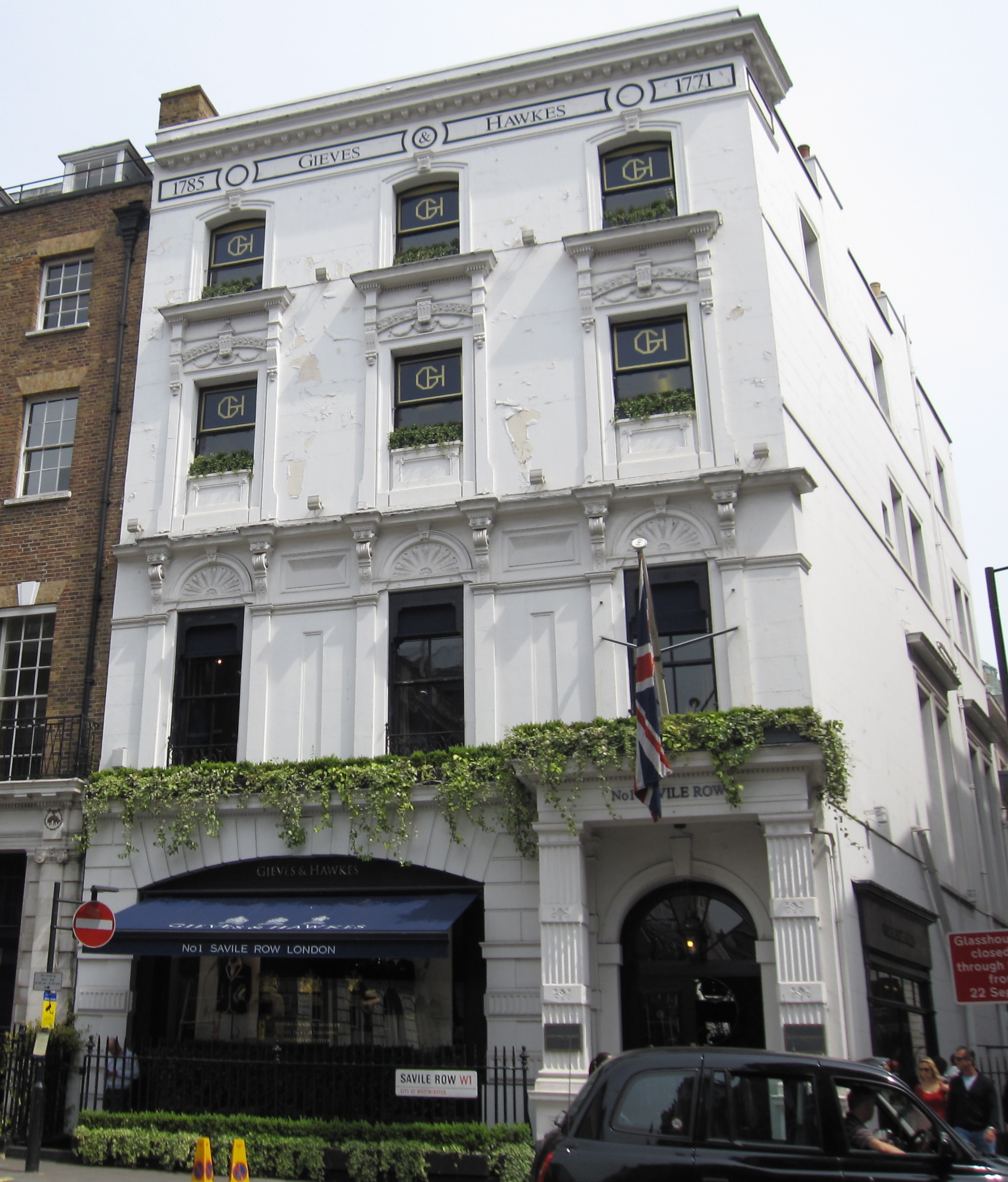
Gieves & Hawkes on No. 1 Savile Row

The Savile Row Bespoke Association (SRBA) was founded in 2004 to protect and to develop bespoke tailoring as practised in Savile Row and the surrounding streets. Founder members include: Anderson & Sheppard, Dege & Skinner, Gieves & Hawkes and Henry Poole. The member-tailors are required to put at least 50 hours of hand labour into each two-piece suit. According to the 2019 report by the SRBA there were 19 tailoring houses with 400 tailors employed and an estimated annual revenue of £40 million. After the challenging times of the COVID-19 pandemic, sales of bespoke suits increased significantly in 2024.

In November 2016, Savile Row became a Special Policy Area within the City of Westminster. This gave Savile Row special planning status to safeguard its character: "Development in the Savile Row Special Policy Area will complement and enhance its role as an international centre of excellence for bespoke tailoring." (For more information, see the section below).

=== 19th century ===
==== Henry Poole and Co ====
Henry Poole & Co are the acknowledged "Founders of Savile Row" and creators of the dinner jacket, called a tuxedo in America. The company has remained a family-run business since their establishment in 1806. They opened first in Brunswick Square, in 1806, originally specialising in military tailoring, especially at the time of the Battle of Waterloo. Their business moved to 36–39 Savile Row in 1846, following the death of founder James Poole. They moved to Cork Street in 1961 with the demolition of their Savile Row property, but managing director Angus Cundey brought the firm back to Savile Row (No. 15) in 1982. Angus died in 2024 and the company is now run by his son, Simon Cundey, the seventh-generation family member.

==== Gieves and Hawkes ====
Gieves & Hawkes is a traditional British gentleman's bespoke tailor located at No. 1 Savile Row. The business dates from the late 19th century, and was formed by the merger of two separate businesses, 'Gieves' (founded 1785) and 'Hawkes' (founded 1771). Starting out with roots from two suppliers who tailored for the British Army and Royal Navy, it was the first Savile Row tailor to provide ready-to-wear clothes. There are various Gieves & Hawkes shops and concessions around the UK and in several other countries. It holds a number of Royal Warrants of Appointment, which cover all three British Royal Warrants (Queen Elizabeth II, Prince Philip, Duke of Edinburgh, and Charles, Prince of Wales). However, its current status is in doubt after Trinity, a subsidiary of Ruyi Group, was subject to a winding-up petition for debt in September 2021 and its subsequent purchase by Mike Ashley's Frasers Group.

==== Dege and Skinner ====
Dege & Skinner (pronounced /ˈdiːdʒ/) is known for military as well as civilian clothing. It remains a family-run business and celebrated its 150th anniversary in 2015. Located at No. 10 Savile Row, the firm was founded as J. Dege & Sons, and became a joint venture between the two families when William Skinner Jr. joined the firm in 1916. After the Skinner family took full ownership, the business was renamed Dege & Skinner, and was reopened by customer Colin Montgomerie. The company is by royal appointment to Her Majesty Queen Elizabeth II, His Majesty the Sultan of Oman and His Majesty the King of Bahrain. TRH William, Prince of Wales and Prince Harry, Duke of Sussex can be seen wearing Blues & Royals uniforms made by the company in the National Portrait Gallery.

Tailors Dege & Skinner made two frock coat uniforms worn by Prince Harry and Prince William at the Wedding of Prince Harry and Meghan Markle in May 2018. As well as the two uniforms, four outfits for the page boys were also created, challenging the tailors because of the boys' size. Eight weeks' notice was given with very strict secrecy involved.

==== Maurice Sedwell ====
Maurice Sedwell was established in 1938 by Maurice Sedwell on Fleet Street in London, before moving to 9 Savile Row in 1963 after its founder won the Tailor & Cutter Academy's gold medal for tailoring excellence. In 1988, long-time employee Andrew Ramroop purchased the business from the retiring founder, becoming the first Black owner of a tailoring house on Savile Row. Under Ramroop's direction, the house relocated to larger premises at 19 Savile Row in 1994 then in 2022 moved again to 9-10 Savile Row. Ramroop also founded the Savile Row Bespoke Academy in 2008 to train future generations of tailors, and the same year he was awarded an OBE for services to Bespoke Tailoring and Training. In 2005 his apprentice Davide Taube (now head cutter at Gieves and Hawkes) won the Golden Shears Competition.

==== Davies and Son ====
Davies and Son are independent tailors on the West side of Savile Row, having started in Hanover Street in 1803. It moved to its current location in 1986, making it the oldest independent tailors on Savile Row. The brand incorporates a number of other tailoring businesses including: Bostridge and Curties and Watson; Fargerstrom and Hughes; Johns and Pegg; James and James; Wells of Mayfair and Fallan & Harvey. It is now owned by Patrick Murphy, Graham Lawless and Mark Broadfield, with former owner Alan Bennett as chair. Davies & Son held the Royal Warrant as Military Tailors to HRH The Duke of Edinburgh. Other customers have included: Joseph P. Kennedy Sr., Calvin Klein, Prince Michael of Kent, Douglas Fairbanks Jr., Edward Fox, Clark Gable, Benny Goodman, Harry S. Truman and the Duke of Windsor and a large proportion of the crowned heads of Europe. Fallon and Harvey was established at 7 Sackville Street in 1975 by Keith Fallan (who had apprenticed at Huntsman and learned cutting at Wealeson and Leagate) and his Wealeson colleague, Peter Harvey.

==== Cooling, Lawrence & Wells ====
Initially, between 1826 and 1829, William Cooling, a tailor originally from Taunton in Somerset, partnered with James Poole (Henry's father). Cooling then started his own business in late 1829 at 47, Maddox Street as a military and civil tailor, with his son-in-law Edward Lawrence, a cutter, becoming a partner in 1844. Edward and his sons George and William would expand the business significantly in the latter half of the 19th Century. Also, there would be another family enterprise when Edward's son-in-law James Wells opened his own business as J.B. & F. Wells in 1880 in Conduit Street. Their customers would include Lords, politicians, business leaders and other wealthy men.

Interestingly, in 1926, something unusual for the time happened when Princess Katerina Galitzine, from an exiled Russian aristocratic family, ordered a men's dinner jacket from Cooling Lawrence & Sons. William Cooling Lawrence was relieved that the Princess was not going to wear it with trousers, although that was emerging as a new evening fashion for women. Instead, she wore a corded silk skirt and waistcoat.

In 1945 the two family businesses would merge after J.B. & F. Wells' premises in Conduit Street, then run by Sidney Wells, were bombed in 1944, becoming Cooling, Lawrence and Wells. In 1962, the business employed their first female apprentice, with the trade noting that this was unusual at the time. Customers included Admiral Sir Charles Madden and the notorious John Bingham, 7th Earl of Lucan.

In 1975 Cooling, Lawrence and Wells merged with J.C. Wells (from a different family), and in 1977 with Cordas and Bright, becoming Wells of Mayfair. John Lawrence Wells was the chairman until he retired in 1985. Wells of Mayfair left No. 47 in 1989 after 160 years of tailoring at the location and moved to 13, Savile Row, ending five generations of the family tailoring in Maddox Street. In 1992, Wells of Mayfair was acquired by Davies and Sons.

==== H. Huntsman and Sons ====
Huntsman commenced in 1849 as gaiter & breeches maker at 126 New Bond Street, moving to 11 Savile Row in 1919. It is famous for the Huntsman silhouette, based on its riding heritage – slim, one-button single breasted coat, with a slight waist and slight flare, and a slightly low opening, and natural shoulder line, refined by Colin Hammick as head cutter in the 1960s–1980s. It was taken over by Roubi L'Roubi and Pierre Lagrange in January 2013. L'Roubi explained to London Evening Standard that "rather than just owning the brand, we have a connection." He stated: "British upper-class fashion is about individuality. What we are wearing today is sombre but people wear tweeds and shooting stockings so bright that you'd never wear in the city, and that's where the character comes out, in the high life." As well as the tailoring business, L'Roubi and Lagrange face challenges at Huntsman, including infrastructure updating. Among the technology being used is an electronic tracer that produces a digital file and hardcopy to store the extensive archive of more than 3000 clients; it is used when ordering ready-to-wear. Lageange stated to Spear's magazine that technology for ready-to-wear is not being used on Savile Row. "The others are afraid of technology. We're competing with Gucci, Ralph Lauren." However, not all changes were seen as beneficial; L'Roubi left the company in 2015 as losses continued to mount.

==== Norton and Sons ====
Norton & Sons was established in the City of Westminster, London in 1821, the firm moving to Savile Row in the middle of the 19th century. In the 1960s Norton's incorporated the Savile Row firm of J. Hoare & E. Tautz. The firm were tailors to Sir Hardy Amies. The company was bought in 2005 by the fashion designer and creative director Patrick Grant, with initially John Kent as cutter. He also relaunched the E. Tautz & Sons brand as ready-to-wear clothing, for which Grant was awarded the Menswear designer of 2010 at the British Fashion Awards (although the company has since been wound up), and he also bought the name of Hammond & Company (established around 1776) and commencing in 2013 used it as the name for a diffusion line with Debenhams, now also closed. Grant stated: "When you walk into our shop you get a sense that you're walking into a place where people enjoy their work and take great pride in it." Previous clients include Edward VII and Winston Churchill. However, the company went into liquidation in 2022 and the goodwill and intellectual property rights were bought back by Patrick Grant via Norton Hammond & Tautz Limited the same year, and it has since been reported that James Sleater and Ian Meiers, directors of Cad & The Dandy, bought Norton & Sons the following year (via another company, Walter Grant Norton Limited), who noted that they would expand into made-to-measure and ready-to-wear.

==== Kilgour, French & Stanbury ====
Founded in 1882 as T & F French in Piccadilly, in 1923 French merged with existing Savile Row tailor A.H. Kilgour to form Kilgour & French. In 1925, Fred and Louis Stanbury joined the firm, and in 1937 the business changed its name to Kilgour, French and Stanbury. Tommy Nutter began his apprenticeship at Kilgour, French & Stanbury in the early 1960s, left in 1969 to co-found Nutters of Savile Row with Edward Sexton, and returned briefly to Kilgour after leaving Nutters in 1976 to open his own shop at 19 Savile Row around 1983. In 2003, the business became Kilgour. Kilgour, French & Stanbury were renowned on Savile Row for a distinctive, military-inspired silhouette; their jackets typically featured heavily canvassed, built-up shoulders and a broad, upright chest, giving a commanding, masculine presence reminiscent of military uniforms. The waist was nipped in to create a V-shaped torso, and jackets were cut slightly longer than modern styles, with structured skirts that balanced the upper body. They are also famous for making Fred Astaire's tailcoat for Top Hat. In 2013, Fung Group acquired Kilgour from JMH Lifestyle and Carlo Brandelli was appointed Creative Director (he was CD between 2003 and 2009). He stated: "The first time I was here [at Kilgour], I contemporised. But this time I'm experimenting with what bespoke can be. Because a suit is still a form of armour, it tells everyone where you are in the hierarchy." The company went into administration on 27 February 2020. Their property on Savile Row was vacated and Kilgour is now an internet-only business offering ready-to-wear clothes.

=== 20th century ===
==== Anderson and Sheppard ====
In the early 20th century, tailoring was softened by Frederick Scholte, a Dutchman, when he developed the English drape for the Prince of Wales (later Edward VIII). Scholte's "dress soft" style was developed into the "London cut", the house style of A&S, by Peter Gustav Anderson, a Swedish protégé of Scholte. The "London cut" is a high, small armhole with a generous upper sleeve that permits the jacket to remain close to the neck while freeing the arm to move with comfort. In 1906, Peter Gustav, also known as Per Anderson, founded A&S at No. 30, Savile Row.

In 2004, A&S' lease at No.30 expired, and the building's landlords wanted to raise its rent. Shortly thereafter, Anda Rowland assumed A&S' daily operations. Rowland, daughter of entrepreneur Tiny Rowland (who had acquired A&S in the late 1970s, and whose family still holds an 80 per cent stake in the business) had been working at Parfums Christian Dior in Paris. After Anda Rowland's mother, Josie, decided to relocate A&S to its current, smaller premises on nearby Old Burlington Street, she appealed to her daughter for assistance in managing the firm. Before Anda's arrival, A&S did not operate a web site or viable computer network, costs were left unrecorded and approximately £500,000 worth of unpaid tailoring bills (money owed to A&S) had accrued. Rowland stated: "We'd been in the old buildings since the 1920s and, like many Savile Row tailors or traditional companies, your image becomes tied ... like Harrods, it becomes tied to the building."

Anda Rowland's initial act at A&S was to create an internet presence for the firm. A&S' website is a marketing tool and, says Rowland, "it helps to remind people or reinforces the idea that we have one foot in the past, but, also, one foot very much in today". Since 2005, A&S' sales have risen exponentially so that, allowing for the hiring of six additional full-time apprentices, for a total of eight. As part of its 2012 revival, A&S opened a haberdashery shop on Clifford Street, at the end of the Row. Previous A&S customers include: Cary Grant, Gary Cooper, Fred Astaire, Pablo Picasso, Bryan Ferry, Manolo Blahnik and Tom Ford. In January 2013, HRH The Prince of Wales visited A&S. In the 30 years that A&S had tailored his suits and coats, HRH had never actually visited the company's premises. In 2012, A&S' revenues topped £4 million and its annual revenues have increased over 13 per cent each year since 2009. A&S manager Colin Heywood stated: "We're doing very well, actually. We've found that business has picked up in the last few years, and we couldn't be busier." However, perhaps with the continued "casualisation" of business and, more recently, the effect of COVID-19, the business has become less profitable than it might otherwise have been.

==== Welsh & Jefferies ====
Welsh & Jefferies had premises at No. 20 (now basement of No. 12). It is owned by James Cottrell and includes the tailors Lesley & Roberts (previously at 16 St George Street, Hanover Square). It started in 1917 on the high street of Eton and became an established military tailor. In 1990, H.R.H. the Prince of Wales confirmed Welsh and Jefferies's pedigree when he appointed the firm with his Royal Warrant as sole military tailor. They are an independent company. Owner James Cottrell started as an apprentice at the age of 16 in Kilgour French & Stanbury and trained there for five years. He worked there as a coatmaker for 15 years before becoming a cutter at Tommy Nutter, from where he went to Henry Poole for 18 years. He was invited to join Welsh & Jefferies as a partner in January 2007, and in February 2013 took over the business with Yingmei Quan as junior partner. Yingmei Quan won the Golden Shears competition in 2011 which enhanced her reputation as one of the better cutters on Savile Row. Cottrell stated: "Finding your cutting style is a process that improves with your experience throughout the years by looking at people's figures and trying to get a perfect line and balance for that person."

==== Chester Barrie ====
Chester Barrie was established in 1935 by expatriate English tailor Simon Ackerman, who wanted a British brand and tailoring for his New York-based clothing business. Locating its factory in Crewe from 1939, close to the Port of Liverpool and its cloth supplier in Huddersfield, it introduced semi-bespoke and ready-to-wear tailoring to the row. Sold to Austin Reed in 1980, it went into receivership in 2002, which split the factory from the retail operation. Now owned by Prominent Europe, clients have included Cary Grant and Winston Churchill, while both Steve McQueen and Sean Connery wore Chester Barrie in their films. However, in 2020 Prominent Europe decided to close its branded business together with its store on the Row. The premises are now occupied by Knatchbull, founded by Daisy Knatchbull, a women's made-to-measure tailors.

==== Hardy Amies ====
The British fashion house Hardy Amies was founded by English dressmaker Hardy Amies in 1946. Having been managing designer for Lachasse in 1934, and having designed clothes for the British Board of Trade under the government Utility Scheme, Amies bought the bombed out shell of No.14 Savile Row in 1946.

Amies was one of the first European designers to venture into the ready-to-wear market when he teamed up with Hepworths in 1959 to design a range of menswear. In 1961, he made fashion history by staging the first men's ready-to-wear catwalk shows, at the Ritz Hotel in London Amies also undertook design for in-house work wear, which developed from designing special clothes for groups such as the Oxford University Boat Club and London Stock Exchange. Amies also designed costumes for films, including 2001: A Space Odyssey.

Amies is perhaps best known to the British public for his work for Queen Elizabeth II. The association began in 1950, when Amies made several outfits for the then Princess Elizabeth's royal tour to Canada. Although the couture side of the Hardy Amies business was traditionally less financially successful, the award of a Royal warrant of appointment as official dressmaker in 1955 gave his house a degree of respectability and resultant publicity. One of his best known creations is the gown he designed in 1977 for Queen Elizabeth's Silver Jubilee portrait which, he said, was "immortalised on a thousand biscuit tins." Knighted in 1989, Amies held the warrant until 1990, when he gave it up so that younger designers could create for the Queen.

In May 1973, Amies sold the business to Debenhams, who had themselves purchased Hepworths which distributed the Hardy Amies line. Amies purchased the business back in 1981. In May 2001, Amies sold his business to the Luxury Brands Group. He retired at the end of that year, when Moroccan-born designer Jacques Azagury became head of couture. In November 2008, after going into bankruptcy, the Hardy Amies brand was acquired by Fung Capital, the private investment arm of Victor and William Fung, who together control the Li & Fung group, though sadly this was to be a short-lived reprieve and the company re-entered administration in January 2019, with the subsequent sale of the flagship No. 14, Savile Row to Hackett. The Hardy Amies name is still licensed globally, particularly in Japan.

==== Nutters of Savile Row ====
Nutters of Savile Row opened at 35a Savile Row on Valentine's Day 1969 by Tommy Nutter with Edward Sexton as head cutter, the two having worked together at Donaldson, Williamson & Ward, and Joseph Morgan as cutter (later joined by Roy Chittleborough). They were financially backed by British singer Cilla Black and her husband Bobby Willis, managing director of the Beatles' Apple Corps, Peter Brown, and lawyer James Vallance-White. Nutters was the first shop on Savile Row to pioneer 'open windows' and had bold displays created by the then unknown Simon Doonan, resulting in the shop helping modernise the perception of Savile Row. Nutters of Savile Row dressed the entire social spectrum from the Duke of Bedford and Lord Montagu, to Mayor of San Francisco Willie Brown, to Mick and Bianca Jagger, Elton John and the Beatles. Their designs included Bianca Jagger's wedding suit. Tommy Nutter was proudest of the fact that the suits worn by three of the Beatles on the front cover of Abbey Road were made by Nutters.

Nutter left the business in 1976 amid disagreement with the other partners and went to work at Kilgour, leaving Sexton, Morgan and Chittleborough to continue running the business. He returned to 19 Savile Row in 1983 as ‘Tommy Nutter, Savile Row’, and continued there until his death from complications arising from HIV/AIDS on 17 August 1992 at the Cromwell Hospital in London. Edward Sexton left the original business in 1980/81 to set up on his own at his premises on Beauchamp Place, Knightsbridge (later returning to Savile Row) until his death in 2023. Chittleborough and Morgan then set up together in 1981, initially in the original Nutter's workshop, eventually settling in the basement of 12 Savile Row (previously the workshop for Huntsman), where they remain.

Meredith Etherington-Smith wrote: "Nutter was a gentle humorist who had a wide and interesting circle of friends attracted by his enthusiasm, by his gentle, self-mocking personality and his acerbic comments on the vagaries of others, always ending with the expression 'But who am I to talk?'."

==== Edward Sexton ====
Edward Sexton (9 November 1942 – 23 July 2023) had a major influence on Savile Row and contemporary men's tailoring. Born in Dagenham, he began learning tailoring in his uncle's workshop and progressed through early work at Harry Hall, Cyril A. Castle, and Kilgour, French & Stanbury. He later worked as a cutter for Welsh & Jefferies and Donaldson, Williams & Ward, where he met Tommy Nutter. In 1969 Sexton co-founded Nutters of Savile Row with Nutter, serving as head cutter and technical director. After Nutter's departure in the mid-1970s, Sexton continued to manage Nutters until 1981, after which he worked alone at various Savile Row addresses and collaborated with international clients before settling in Knightsbridge in 1990. He was subsequently joined by Dominic Sebag Montefiore as creative director. Sexton returned to Savile Row in 2022 at 35 Savile Row, where he continued to produce bespoke tailoring until his death at age 80. The shop continues with initially Nina Penlington as the head cutter.

==== Chittleborough & Morgan ====
Chittleborough & Morgan was founded in 1981 by Roy Chittleborough and Joe Morgan at 12 Savile Row after Edward Sexton left them to set up on his own; both were former cutters at Nutters of Savile Row, where they helped shape the Row's modernist revival of the late 1960s and 1970s. Chittleborough retired in 2011, since when the firm has been led by Joe Morgan, and it has also served as a training ground for other cutters including Michael Browne and Francis Paley. Their cut is widely described as a structured, close-fitting silhouette with high armholes, strong shoulders, and pronounced waist suppression, descended from the disciplined but expressive “Nutter school” rather than the softer English drape.

=== New generation ===
Modernisation, which had begun in 1969 with Nutters of Savile Row, had slowed by the early 1990s, so Savile Row tailors were "struggling to find relevance with an audience that had grown increasingly disassociated". Three "New Generation" designers are credited with keeping Savile Row ahead of the times: they were Ozwald Boateng, Timothy Everest (a former apprentice of Nutter's) and Richard James. Having each broken away independently from the Savile Row mould, public relations professional Alison Hargreaves coined the term "New Bespoke Movement" to describe collectively the work of this "new generation" of tailors. Interest reached a peak in 1997 when the three were featured together in Vanity Fair. The newcomers altered their shop fronts and used marketing and publicity to their advantage. For example, when Richard James opened its Savile Row store in 1992, it introduced Saturday opening, something of a revolution to Savile Row at that time.

The new generation challenged the traditional Savile Row styling, bringing twists and "a fine sense of colour to bespoke suits." They were seen to "push the envelope of modern suit making and bespoke active wear, creating more contemporary silhouettes with bolder fabrics." Unlike the older establishments, this new generation of tailors set out to garner celebrity clients, disseminate their products via supermarket chains and attract wider national and international custom, raising the profile of their new tailoring style. In 2001 Richard James was awarded the title Menswear Designer of the Year by the British Fashion Council, following that up in 2008 with the Bespoke Designer of the Year award, in recognition of its contribution to British tailoring. Boateng received the French Trophee de la Mode for Best Male Designer in 1996.

==== Richard James ====
Richard James was founded in 1992 by designer Richard James and his business partner Sean Dixon and was the first of the 'New Establishment' or New Bespoke Movement tailors of Savile Row. James's tailoring has always centred on what has become known as its "modern classic" style: one or two-button single-breasted suits with slightly longer, more waisted jackets, incorporating deep side vents and a slightly higher armhole to give a slim, definitive silhouette. The overall design philosophy is to produce classic clothing, but push the barriers through experimenting with fabrics and making bold use of colour. Indeed, the British fashion writer and academic Colin McDowell has described James himself as being "the best colourist working in menswear in London today".

==== Ozwald Boateng ====
Ozwald Boateng, a pioneer of the new generation, saw himself as both tailor and a designer, coining the term "bespoke couturier". Born in Muswell Hill in 1967 to Ghanaian parents and raised in North London, Boateng started tailoring at age 16, selling his mother's designs on Portobello Road; by twenty-three he had set himself up full-time in business. He began making bespoke suits in 1990, and is credited with introducing Savile Row tailoring to a new generation. The first tailor to stage a catwalk show in Paris, Boateng's many clients include Will Smith, Jamie Foxx, Samuel L. Jackson, Dhani Jones, Russell Crowe, Keanu Reeves, and Mick Jagger. LVMH President Bernard Arnault appointed Boateng Creative Director of Menswear at French Fashion house Givenchy in 2004. His first collection was shown in July 2004 in Paris, at Hotel de Ville. Boateng parted with Givenchy after the Spring 2007 collection.

==== Steed Bespoke Tailors ====
Steed Bespoke Tailors was established in January 1995 by Edwin DeBoise, whose father and brother are both tailors, and Thomas Mahon. They are based in nearby Clifford Street and in Cumbria making bespoke and semi-bespoke suits. DeBoise trained at the London College of Fashion, and then apprenticed under Edward Sexton, followed by seven years at Anderson & Sheppard, before founding the company Steed. 2002 was Steed's eighth year in business and one that saw an amicable split with Mahon, who is now with Redmayne. In September 2008, Edwin's eldest son Matthew DeBoise joined the company.

==== Kent and Haste ====
John Kent and Terry Haste have worked together, on and off, for over 30 years. John held the Royal Warrant for many years for the late Duke of Edinburgh, who had followed John from Hawes and Curtis when he left that company to set up on his own. Terry, previously Head Cutter and managing director at Huntsman (having originally started his apprenticeship at Anderson and Sheppard), joined John about fourteen years ago. The two had previously worked together at Hawes & Curtis together with Stephen Lachter, shirtmaker, who still works with them in Sackville Street. Terry worked with Tommy Nutter, designing and cutting such garments as the outfits of The Joker in Batman, and then at Huntsman, being responsible for many of their iconic garments including the double-breasted suit worn by Alexander McQueen.

John Kent has now retired. In 2025, Dario Carnera joined Kent Haste from Huntsman, where he served as head cutter, joining an established team that included Suyamba Kumaresan as cutter and Mollie Fresle-McLaren as trouser cutter, both of whom were trained in-house.

==== Richard Anderson ====
Richard Anderson was founded in 2001 by Richard Anderson and Brian Lishak who acquired Strickland & Sons (est. 1780) in 2004. Richard Anderson is author of Bespoke: Savile Row Ripped and Smoothed, his autobiographic account of being an apprentice tailor. Customers have included Mick Jagger, Bryan Ferry and the Black Eyed Peas.

==== Stowers ====
Stowers (initially called Stowers Bespoke), was established in 2006 by Ray Stowers, former head of bespoke at Gieves & Hawkes for 25 years, and was created to reverse the trend in the modern market to mass-produce garments in the Far East, with all ready to wear suits, accessories and made to measure suits produced in England. In 2008, Stowers Bespoke purchased the shop at 13 Savile Row from retiring tailor James Levett, working with Savile Row veterans Brian Pusey and Brian Jeffrey. The company Stowers Bespoke Ltd. was dissolved in December 2023.

==== Cad and the Dandy ====
Cad and the Dandy was founded in 2008 by former bankers James Sleater and Ian Meiers. Cad and the Dandy initially came to an arrangement with Chittleborough & Morgan to allow appointments in their shop, before launching a new flagship store at 13 Savile Row in June 2013. The store is the first on the street to hand weave a cloth on site before making it up into a fully finished suit. With Britain's bespoke tailoring industry facing an alarming shortage of master tailors, the company established an apprenticeship programme in London with young "would-be tailors" in its three London locations: Savile Row, Birchin Lane and Canary Wharf. In 2013, Cad and the Dandy bought the shoe manufacturer Wildsmith, a 166-year-old business.

==== Kathryn Sargent ====
In April 2016, tailor Kathryn Sargent became the first woman to open a tailoring house in Savile Row. As of 2023, Sargent is resident in Brook Street and has a branch in Edinburgh. Among those Sargent has dressed include royalty, actors, politicians and sportsmen. The master tailor, originally from Leeds, spent 15 years at nearby Gieves & Hawkes, rising through the ranks to be head cutter before opening her first store in Brook Street in 2012. She said that it gave a sense of achievement and that it is "just great to have your shop and your garments on display for people to see." William Skinner from Dege & Skinner said: "It's fitting that the first woman to be appointed as a head cutter ... is returning to open a shop of her own." In an interview with Another Magazine in 2012, Sargent said that she wanted to be a skilled worker rather than just a designer and to be able to fit something perfectly.

==== Whitcomb and Shaftesbury ====
Whitcomb and Shaftesbury (W&S), named after the intersection of two nearby streets, was started in 2004 by two Indian twins Mahesh and Suresh Ramakrishnan on St. George Street, near Savile Row. Both had been working in New York but the brothers spotted "a gap in the market for high quality tailoring and quality advice". The Chennai-born twins were able to lure head cutter John McCabe, a Savile Row stalwart having spent over 40 years cutting for the major names on the row. W&S's Savile Row Bespoke line is made in London, but they have another range, the relatively more affordable Classic Bespoke, which, while cut in London, is tailored in Chennai by handpicked craftspeople trained to Savile Row standards. W&S has two units in Chennai staffed by approximately 85 local craftspeople. In 2009 W&S established a new program concentrating on abused and deprived women in rural India, who undergo a rigorous 3-year training and certification programme: over 300 artisans have passed through this. Former clients include Sachin Tendulkar, Mick Jagger, Michael Jackson and Richard Gere. Mahesh stated: "The art of Savile Row is to create a three-dimensional form that drapes the body and shows structure while still being fluid and non-restrictive."

==== Clothsurgeon ====
Clothsurgeon was founded in 2012 by Rav Matharu, opening its first store at 40 Savile Row in August 2022. The store is the first on the street specialising in tailored streetwear.

==== Fedro Gaudenzi ====
Fedro Gaudenzi is a bespoke tailoring house located on Cork Street, near Savile Row, and in 2024 became a member of the Savile Row Bespoke Association. Established in 2016 by Italian-born tailor Fedro Gaudenzi, the atelier specialises in luxury bespoke garments for both men and women. Founded in a workshop in Lambeth, London, the house initially operated exclusively by appointment, focusing on personalised tailoring and craftsmanship. By 2023, it had relocated to Cork Street in Mayfair.

=== Other companies on Savile Row ===
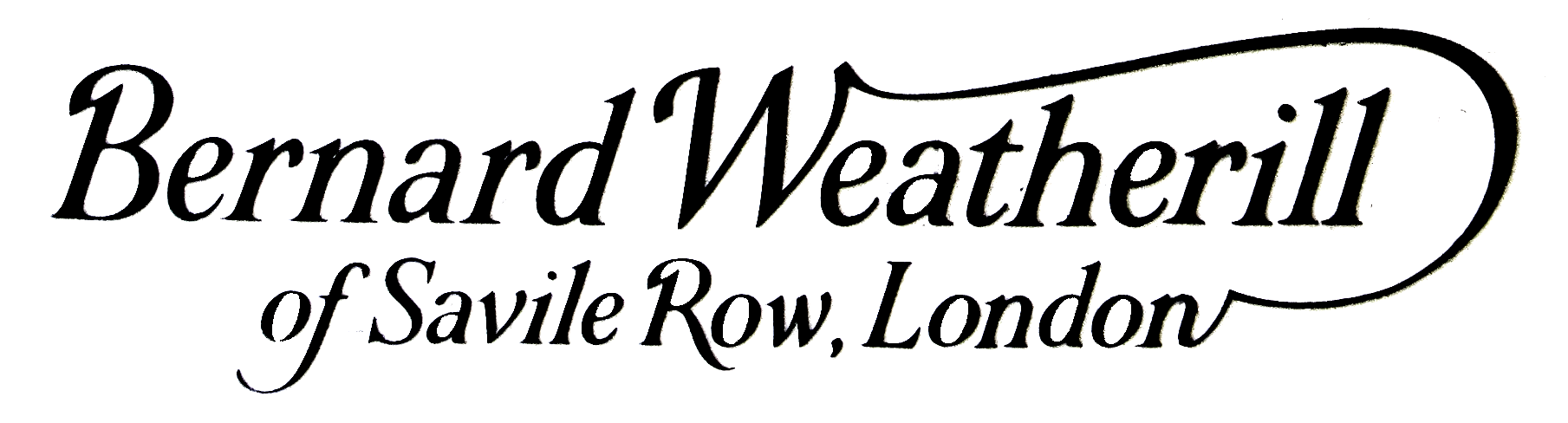
Company logo of Bernard Weatherill Ltd on 5 Savile Row

- Kent & Curwen (No. 2); Bernard Weatherill (No. 5 – closed at the same time as Kilgour as had become a subsidiary of that company); the cloth merchants Holland & Sherry were at No. 9–10 Savile Row (where they offered fitting space to various visiting tailors, including Higgins & Brown, Katherine Maylin Ladies Bespoke Tailors, King & Allen, Manning & Manning and Nooshin,) but relocated to ground and lower ground floor 31 Savile Row in 2022, where it would appear they continue to allow visiting tailors to have rooms as Alexandra Wood operates from a Savile Row penthouse suite; Paul Jheeta (No. 12); Castle Tailors (No. 12); Steven Hitchcock (No. 13); Martin Nicholls London Ltd. (No. 13); Hidalgo Bros. (No. 13); James Levett (No. 14); Stuart Lamprell (No. 18); Gary Anderson (No. 34/35); Alexandre: owned by British Menswear Brands (No. 39); the Savile Row Company (at No. 40 – mainly ready-to-wear and made-to-measure but also offering bespoke).
- The oldest tailors in London, Ede & Ravenscroft, have premises close by on Burlington Gardens.
- Knatchbull (formerly The Deck), located at 32 Savile Row, is the first female-only tailoring house to have a shopfront in Savile Row's history. This was previously the premises of Tobias Tailors which commenced as Tobias Brothers in 1895 at 8 Oxford Street, later moving to 20 Princes Street, Hanover Square and then 19 Sackville Street before its final move to Savile Row, closing in 2003. The last owners were John Coggin (now died) and John Davies, who after the closure worked for a period for Hackett on Bishopsgate and continues to work (now with his daughter) from a garden studio at home.
- Drake's (No. 9) selling clothes "people can and will want to wear for years and years."
- At No. 14, J.P. Hackett offers both a bespoke and made-to-measure service. The larger Hackett Ltd chain was founded by Jeremy Hackett and Ashley Lloyd-Jennings in London in 1983.
- Banshee of Savile Row, located at No.13, presented their third collection at London Fashion Week. Irish tailor and designer Ruby Slevin founded the company in 2019 using a name inspired by powerful female symbolism and Irish mysticism.

=== Conduit Street tailors ===
- Established by Austrian tailor Jonathan Meyer at 36 Conduit Street in the late 18th century, Meyer & Mortimer supplied both the Prince regent and his fashion mentor, Beau Brummell, as early as 1800. When the Prince became George IV of the United Kingdom he awarded the company a Royal warrant of appointment which, through Queen Victoria and monarchs since, it still holds today. After Meyer pioneered modern trouser design in the 19th century, he formed a new company with Mortimer in Edinburgh, Meyer & Mortimer, also called the Royal Clan Tartan Warehouse. After being bombed out of its premises during World War II, the company relocated to 6 Sackville Street, also given as the address of Jones, Chalk and Dawson (commenced trading 1896 and currently listed at Companies House as dormant) and also Ward & Kruger, with which they appear to have amalgamated, before moving round the corner to 40 Piccadilly in 2022. Also at 6 Sackville Street was Brian Russell and Company. Brian Russell had worked at Anderson & Sheppard for 20 years before striking out on his own in Mayfair in 1987. He subsequently employed Fadia Aoun as a cutter (who had previously worked at Johns & Pegg but left when they became part of Davies & Son), and she took over the company on his death in 2007, keeping his name. However, the Sackville Street site has been vacated and the website no longer gives an address.
- In the late 1950s, from his premises at No.29 Conduit Street, Anthony Sinclair created a classic, pared down shape, which became known as the Conduit Cut. Sean Connery famously adopted the look in 1962 for the first James Bond film, Dr. No, and continued to wear Sinclair suits for all of his appearances as Bond. Though it is sometimes reported that Ian Fleming and his character James Bond bought suits on Savile Row, there is no evidence for this in the James Bond books, and Fleming's own tailor was Benson, Perry & Whitley, located at 9 Cork Street in Mayfair.
- Another Conduit Street tailor, at No. 42, was Cyril Castle, who made the earlier James Bond suits for Roger Moore (later being replaced by Douglas Hayward in Mount Street), and for whom a young Edward Sexton worked. Bernard Weatherill was also here until bombed out in 1939.
- Over the years many other tailors have been recorded in this street, such as JB & F Wells (initially at 24 then 57 Conduit Street, the latter site destroyed during WWII. The company then moved to 47 Maddox Street with Cooling, Lawrence & Sons and eventually formed Wells of Mayfair, moving to Savile Row around 1989 and becoming part of Davies and Son in 1992, Hammond and Riddle (53 Conduit Street); Forster, Fisher and French (36 Conduit Street); Skrimshire and Herford (17 Conduit Street); Sandilands & Son (12 Conduit Street); Kettle & Smith (41 Conduit Street); J Stohwasser (39 Conduit Street) and Stovel & Co. (3 Conduit Street).

=== Recent activities ===
As of November 2014, there are only two family-owned tailoring houses left on Savile Row: Dege & Skinner and Henry Poole & Co. Managing director of D&S William G. Skinner, when interviewed by The Business of Fashion (BofF) website, stated: "Ready-to-wear has been available on the Row for some time, but recession and a tough economic climate have led some retailers further down the road of ready-to-wear..." Although in recent years the global luxury menswear market has grown at roughly double the pace of luxury womenswear, the tailors of Savile Row face the stark reality that bespoke tailoring is simply not a scalable business.

How different companies compete in the forthcoming years will vary. Starting with the 150-year-old company Dege & Skinner, William Skinner points out the young people involved: the future generation of tailors, serving apprenticeships within the trade. He stated in a 2014 interview to The Guardian: "We have invested in the future of the trade, because we are confident about the future of the trade. We have a good business model; we make money and we reinvest it in the company. We are not a museum piece by any means."

Patrick Grant, designer and former director of bespoke tailor Norton & Sons, stated to The BofF: "The simple truth is that there are opportunities to sell ready-to-wear clothes thanks to Savile Row's history." He continued: "Personally as someone who has a business on both sides, I would like to see anything with a Savile Row name on it actually made on Savile Row... If you have got ten thousand suits being made by hand on Savile Row, but you have got a million suits somewhere in a factory in Asia also called Savile Row, I don't think it can do anything other than hurt the business here."

Henry Poole & Co. are wanting to expand into China. In an interview with CNBC, Simon Cundey, director of Henry Poole & Co, stated: "We've had a number of customers who have ordered in London and want the attention to detail we offer them and we hope that by bringing that option to Beijing we can grow the market there." Henry Poole & Co already has two stores in China through a partnership; however tailors make the framework for the suit in London and send it over to be assembled in a Chinese factory.

In recent years, many alumni of the major Savile Row shops have gone on to set up their own tailoring businesses around the world, offering services and products that are rooted in the traditions of Savile Row. These include tailors such as Richard James, David Reeves of Reeves Bespoke, who have all established their own successful bespoke tailoring houses outside of London.

Sustainability has been present on SR with repurposing, recycling, repairing and minimising waste being part of bespoke tailoring. An initiative by former SRBA director Su Thomas has enabled tailors, accessories and cloth merchants in and around SR to participate in the Eco-Luxe project by recycling their wool off-cuts. After spending months gathering fabric cuttings, the excess cloth was sent to iinouiio in Yorkshire where it was converted into a yarn and then woven by the Wooven in the Bone micro-mill in Scotland. By February 2024, approximately 100 metres of luxury grey herringbone and twill wool cloth has been produced by this method and demonstrates a future with zero-waste tailoring, reducing re-usable resources that might be sent to landfill.

As a result of the popularity of the weight loss drug Ozempic, staffing has recently become a problem. As clients seek to have older suits and shirts altered, the number of tailors available for all this work, coupled with a busy time for bespoke sales, has meant that extra alteration tailors have been employed, of which there are only so many. As a consequence, "the city’s most celebrated tailors are overwhelmed."

== Westminster Special Policy Area 2016 ==
In November 2016, Savile Row was given special planning rules within the City of Westminster by the introduction of "Special Policy Areas". These new planning rules include four other areas and will "make it far harder for developers and landlords to dilute their distinctive character by allowing "clone" chain stores to force out smaller independent businesses." Mark Henderson of G&H and chairman of Savile Row Bespoke Association is quoted as saying "I'm absolutely delighted. It's recognition that Savile Row is totally unique."

Westminster policy "CM2.3: Savile Row Special Policy Area" states: "The Savile Row Special Policy Area (SPA) is home to a historic concentration of bespoke tailoring, with the street name in itself acting as a widely recognised international brand, synonymous with the unique and high quality bespoke and discreet, personal service it offers." It also states: "Encouraging bespoke tailoring uses in the Savile Row SPA will continue to support this cluster of bespoke tailoring activities and the wider bespoke tailoring industry in Westminster and the UK."

Councillor Robert Davis said: "Like a good suit, planning policy should be made to measure. ...We are using our powers to protect some of the capital's most valuable assets and create environments where specialist traders can thrive."

== See also ==
- Suit (clothing)
- Haute couture
- British Fashion Council
- Worshipful Company of Merchant Taylors
- Worshipful Company of Drapers
