= Owen Scholte =

British flying ace (1896–1918)

- Born: Owen John Frederick Scholte; 22 June 1896; St. John's Wood, London, England
- Died: 30 July 1918 (aged 22); Abbeville, France
- Burial place: Saint-Riquier British Cemetery, Somme, Picardy, France; 50°08′01″N 1°56′32″E
- Military career
- Allegiance: United Kingdom
- Branch: British Army; Royal Air Force
- Service years: 1915–1918
- Rank: Captain
- Units: Bedfordshire Regiment; No. 18 Squadron RFC; No. 51 Squadron RFC; No. 48 Squadron RFC; No. 60 Squadron RAF
- Conflicts: World War I • Western Front
- Awards: Military Cross

Captain Owen John Frederick Scholte MC (22 June 1896 – 30 July 1918) was a British flying ace of the First World War, credited with eight aerial victories before his death in an automobile accident.

== Early life and background ==
Scholte was born in St. John's Wood, London, the second son of Dutch-born Savile Row tailor Frederick Scholte, and his wife Emma (née Lewellen). He attended Mill Hill School, London, from 1909 to 1912.

== Military service ==
Scholte was commissioned as a temporary second lieutenant in the infantry on 20 March 1915, and served in the 3rd (Reserve) Battalion, Bedfordshire Regiment. He was promoted to lieutenant on 1 June 1916, and was transferred to the General List when seconded to the Royal Flying Corps and appointed a flying officer on 5 June.

Scholte first served in No. 18 and No. 51 Squadrons, before transferring to No. 48 Squadron to fly the Bristol F.2 two-seater fighter. His first aerial victories came on 2 May 1917, when he and observer/gunner Air Mechanic 2nd Class F. W. Dame, accounted for two Albatros D.IIIs over Biache-Vitry. His next two victories were gained with observer/gunner Second Lieutenant Alexander Merchant, driving down an Albatros D.III over Brebières on 29 June, and destroying an Albatros D.V east of Cambrai on 6 July. On 13 July he and Lieutenant Alan Light drove down an Albatros D.V over Slype, and on 5 September, with Second Lieutenant G. R. Horsfall, he drove down another D.V over Mariakerke.

Scholte's award of the Military Cross was gazetted on 14 September 1917. His citation read:

Temporary Second Lieutenant (Temporary Lieutenant) Owen John Frederick Scholte, General List and Royal Flying Corps.

"For conspicuous gallantry and devotion to duty on many occasions whilst carrying out reconnaissances and especially whilst protecting machines returning from patrols. He has continually distinguished himself by discovering hostile aircraft whilst observing from high altitudes, and attacking them with great determination and success at close range. His vigilance, combined with his fine offensive spirit, have many times proved invaluable in frustrating hostile reconnaissances and driving their machines down out of control."

On 1 April 1918, the Army's Royal Flying Corps and the Royal Naval Air Service were merged to form the Royal Air Force. Soon after Scholte transferred to No. 60 Squadron to fly the S.E.5a single-seat fighter. He was appointed a flight commander with the rank of acting-captain on 4 May 1918, and soon after gained his final two victories, sending enemy reconnaissance aircraft down in flames on 15 and 19 May.

== Death ==
On 30 July 1918, Scholte was a passenger in an automobile returning from a party in Dieppe, driven by his old Mill Hill schoolmate Major Cyril Crowe. The automobile collided with a tree in Abbeville, and Scholte and another passenger Major Cyril E. Foggin were killed. Scholte is buried in Saint-Riquier British Cemetery, Somme, France, and is commemorated in Hampstead Cemetery alongside his brother Frederick Lewellen Scholte.
