= Drape (disambiguation) =

Drape can refer to:

- a curtain
- Drapery, cloth used for decorative purposes
- Drape suit, a British variation of the lounge suit
