= Kathryn Sargent =

First woman to open a tailoring house in London's Savile Row

Kathryn Sargent is a British master tailor and operator of her eponymous bespoke tailoring house. In April 2016, Kathryn Sargent became the first woman to open a tailoring house in Savile Row. As of 2023, Sargent is resident in Brook Street and has a branch in Edinburgh. Among those Sargent has dressed include royalty, actors, politicians and sportsmen. The master tailor, originally from Leeds, spent 15 years at nearby Gieves & Hawkes, rising through the ranks to be head cutter before opening her first store in Brook Street in 2012. She said that it gave a sense of achievement and that it is "just great to have your shop and your garments on display for people to see." William Skinner from Dege & Skinner said: "It's fitting that the first woman to be appointed as a head cutter ... is returning to open a shop of her own." In an interview with Another Magazine in 2012, Sargent said that she wanted to be a skilled worker rather than just a designer and to be able to fit something perfectly.

== Honours ==
Sargent's name is one of those featured on the sculpture Ribbons, unveiled in 2024.
