= Edward Sexton =

British tailor and fashion designer (1942–2023)

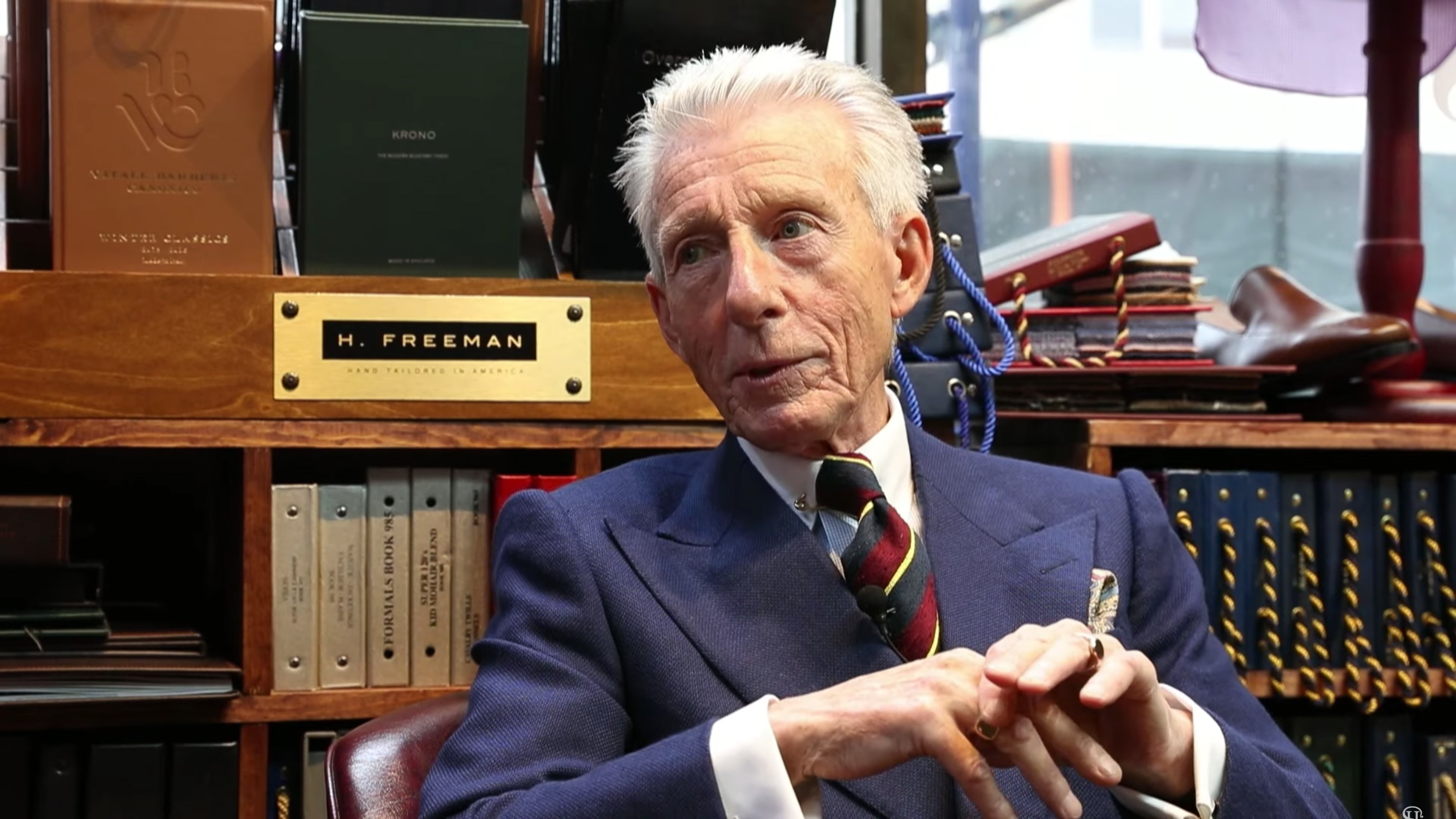
- Sexton in 2016
- Born: 9 November 1942; Dagenham, Essex, England
- Died: 23 July 2023 (aged 80)
- Education: English Martyrs School
- Occupations: Tailor, fashion designer
- Labels: Savile Row; Tommy Nutter; Stella McCartney; Chloe

Edward Sexton (9 November 1942 – 23 July 2023) was a British Savile Row tailor, fashion designer and manufacturing consultant. Sexton was called a key player in the history of Savile Row.

== Early life ==
Edward Sexton went to English Martyrs School (in Southwark) from 1953 to 1957. Leaving school, Sexton went to work at Lew Rose (in 1957), a suit manufacturing factory in East London, where he received his initial training. Lew Rose operated a section production system; Sexton progressed around each section developing basic tailoring skills.

In 1959, Sexton went to work as an apprentice for Jerry Vanderstine, a coat maker who worked for Harry Hall (specialist equestrian tailor on Regent Street, London). In 1959, John Oates, the head cutter at Harry Hall, then asked Sexton to come and work as an assistant cutter and trimmer.

In 1961, Sexton worked at Cyril A. Castle, a celebrity tailor, as an assistant jacket-cutter and trouser-cutter. While working at Cyril A. Castle, Sexton got his first position of responsibility on the cutting board and put himself through a pattern cutting course at Barrett Street Technical College (later to become part of the London College of Fashion).

In 1962, Sexton moved to Kilgour French and Stanbury, where he finished his training.

In 1966, Sexton got his first job as a fully-fledged cutter at (military tailor) Welsh and Jefferies, where he honed his skills cutting both military and civilian tailoring. Sexton made trips to Royal Military Academy Sandhurst to make uniforms for officers passing. Sexton believed this experience proved invaluable to the work he would later produce.

== Nutters of Savile Row ==
In 1967, Sexton went to work as a cutter for Donaldson, Williams and Ward, where he met the young salesman Tommy Nutter. Nutter quickly recognised Sexton's talent and they started working together for private clients. Through this work they began to develop a style (a waisted and flared jacket with wide lapels and parallel trousers) which was to evolve over the years. Nutter was very handsome and always impeccably dressed, and quickly drew clients from his social circle, which was growing in size and influence.

On 14 February 1969, Edward Sexton and Tommy Nutter opened Nutters of Savile Row at No. 35a Savile Row, with the backing of Cilla Black, Bobby Willis, James Vallance White and Peter Brown. This was the first new Savile Row establishment in 120 years. Nutter was the creative force and front of house focus, while Sexton was a traditional bespoke master cutter who created the garments. It has been said that "Sexton was the genius behind Nutters."

In 1976, Tommy left Nutters of Savile Row and Sexton became managing director. Sexton remained managing director until 1982, when he moved from 35a to 36–37 Savile Row and opened a shop in his own name.

== Leaving Savile Row ==
In 1991, Sexton left Savile Row to set up in Knightsbridge, alongside couturiers Caroline Charles and Bruce Oldfield. Sexton continued to operate, by appointment only, from a studio on Beauchamp Place, producing bespoke tailoring for both men and women. Bespoke shirts and an exclusive selection of accessories for his customers offer a complete Sexton 'look'.

== Consultancy and collaborations ==
=== Wilkes Bashford ===
From 1987, Sexton produced a collaborative range for Wilkes Bashford in San Francisco.

=== Poor Little Rich Girl ===
Sexton made the costumes for the $12million NBC production of Poor Little Rich Girl: The Barbara Hutton Story. Sexton dressed many of the characters in the film, including James Read as Cary Grant, Anthony Peck, and Farrah Fawcett.

=== Saks Fifth Avenue ready to wear ===
In September 1988, Sexton created an exclusive line for Saks Fifth Avenue of made to measure suits and ready to wear tailoring: shirts, ties, socks, canes, hats, pocket squares and ascots.

=== Stella McCartney and Chloé ===
In 1995, while studying at Central St. Martins, Stella McCartney served an apprenticeship with Sexton, who was her father's tailor. Sexton helped McCartney develop her graduate show that was modelled by Kate Moss, Naomi Campbell and Yasmin Le Bon. The show made front-page news, and the entire collection was sold to Tokio, a London boutique.

In 1997, when McCartney took over from Karl Lagerfeld at Chloé, as creative director she "relied on" Sexton to create her first Paris collection. Sexton worked for Chloé as a consultant and continued tutoring McCartney in cutting, design, fabric selection and tailoring. In 1999, Sexton refused to renew his contract with Chloé.

=== Petra Ecclestone Form Clothing ===
In 2007, Bernie Ecclestone showed Sexton designs by his 18-year-old daughter Petra. Sexton was impressed, and he started working with Petra to develop her label, Form, though the company closed the following year.

== Death ==
Edward Sexton died on 23 July 2023, at the age of 80.

== Famous outfits ==
Notable clients included:

Client	Profession	Most notable clothes made by Edward Sexton
Annie Lennox	Musician	Suit worn in "Full Steam" video
Bernie Ecclestone	Business magnate	Three piece suits
Bianca Jagger	Model	Iconic White Suit
David Gray	Musician	Suit worn in "Full Steam" video
Marie Helvin	Model	
Mark Ronson	Musician	White wedding suit
Paul McCartney	Musician	Suit worn on Abbey Road album cover
Ringo Starr	Musician	Suit worn on Abbey Road album cover
Twiggy	Model	Cherry red velvet suit
Yoko Ono	Artist	White jump suit
Harry Styles	Singer	Pink tour suit
Adam Lambert	Singer	Velvet Album suits
