= Cad and the Dandy =

Independent tailoring company based in London, England

Coordinates: 51°30′47″N 0°5′9″W

- Company type: Private
- Industry: Tailoring
- Founded: 2008
- Founders: James Sleater, Ian Meiers
- Headquarters: London, UK
- Website: www.cadandthedandy.co.uk

Cad and the Dandy is an independent tailoring company based in London, England, with premises on Savile Row, in the City and New York City, that sells bespoke suits.

== History ==
Cad and the Dandy was founded in 2008 by James Sleater and Ian Meiers, two former bankers. They met through a supplier, as both pursued a similar business idea independently, and agreed to start the company together, each contributing £20,000 of initial capital. Both had family connections to the tailoring industry, giving them knowledge helpful in launching the new company.

After initially conducting fittings in rented office space, they came to an arrangement with Chittleborough & Morgan to allow appointments in their shop on Savile Row. In October 2009, the company opened its first permanent store in the City of London.

The company had a turnover of £1.3M in 2010, and was listed by The Guardian in the Courvoisier Future 500. In July 2010 the founders won the Bento Entrepreneur of the Year Award at the Macworld Awards and in July 2013 they opened permanent premises on Savile Row.

In 2018, Cad and The Dandy opened a New York store, on W 57th St, and also bought Götrich, Scandinavia's oldest tailoring house.

== Operations ==
Based in London, Cad & the Dandy employs more than 30 tailors in three workshops. The company launched a new flagship store at 13 Savile Row in June 2013. The store is the first on the tailoring street to hand-weave a cloth before making it up into a fully finished suit. The company established an apprenticeship programme for would-be tailors in London.

Since 2016, MSR Garments, located in Sri City, India, produces majority of the bespoke suits for Cad & The Dandy.

== See also ==
- Suitsupply
- Savile Row tailoring
