= Frederick Scholte =

Dutch-born London tailor

- Born: Friedrich Petrus Scholte; 19 July 1865; Amsterdam, Netherlands
- Died: 2 December 1948 (aged 83); Virginia Water, Surrey, England
- Occupation: Master tailor
- Known for: Drape suit

Friedrich "Frederick" Petrus Scholte (19 July 1865 – 2 December 1948) was a Dutch-born British tailor known for the drape suit, a cut he introduced in the 1930s while a master tailor on London's Savile Row. He was considered a pioneer in 20th-century menswear as tailor to fashion icon Edward VIII from 1919–1948. (Note: Many sources incorrectly state Scholte was tailor to the Duke of Windsor until 1959, but he died in 1948.)

== Early life ==
Scholte was born in Amsterdam to Johann Friedrich Scholte, who was of paternal German descent, and Johanna Cornelia Jacoba van Klaveren. He emigrated to London in the 1880s. Viscount Ridley sponsored his naturalisation process in 1899.

== Career ==
Scholte operated his own tailoring house on Savile Row in Mayfair, London. He served as an apprentice tailor to the Household Cavalry and adapted three characteristics of their military uniform into: wide shoulders, roomy armholes, and narrow waists.

In 1917, Tailor & Cutter magazine praised the outstanding craftsmanship of Scholte's tailoring at his shop on Savile Row, which overlooked Henry Poole & Co.:

"Scholte's is not a firm with old traditions, it is something more, it is one that is making history. The guiding spirit there has the originality that we term genius. It is always unwise in tailoring matters to say that any one man has invented a thing; but if Scholte did not invent the method of cutting, manipulation, etc., which is associated with his work, at least he believed in it, adopted it, and worked it successfully. In those informal discussions which used to take place after the Metropolitan Society's meetings, it was always interesting to note how often Scholte's methods and his work were discussed; and among those men of experience and ability, although some did not believe in the methods, there was but one opinion as to the beauty of effect which they produced.

If one may be pardoned for introducing the personal note, I have a friend who is rich enough to get his clothes made by Scholte, and I have on various occasions seen his dress coat. It was a beautiful production; one could, without exaggeration, call it a work of art. There was something in it beyond correct cutting and good tailoring; there was the breath of life in it."

— Tailor & Cutter, 1917

Scholte invented the drape suit for Prince of Wales (later Edward VIII and the Duke of Windsor). Scholte was the duke's principal tailor from 1919 until his own death in 1948. The looser, draped cut was in contrast to the tighter, more restrictive clothing of the Victorian era, and proved extremely influential in 20th-century men's fashion. It created a "revolution" in men's fashion.

Several of the Duke of Windsor's jackets made by Scholte are in the collection of the Metropolitan Museum of New York's Costume Institute.

== Personal life ==
In 1888, Scholte married Emma Lewellen, with whom he had four children. His two elder sons served in the First World War. Lt.-Col. Lewellen Friedrich Scholte (1890–1984) was appointed an Officer of the Order of the British Empire in the 1919 New Year Honours. Capt. Owen Scholte (1896–1918) earned the Military Cross as a flying ace.

Scholte died in 1948 at Holloway Sanatorium (that year converted into an NHS hospital) in Virginia Water, Surrey.
