= Cyril Crowe =

Cyril Marconi Crowe
- Born: 6 January 1894; Oakengates, Shropshire, England
- Died: 31 May 1974 (aged 80); Swindon, Wiltshire, England
- Military career
- Allegiance: United Kingdom
- Branch: British Army; Royal Air Force
- Service years: 1914–1919; 1937–1954
- Rank: Wing Commander
- Nickname: Billy
- Units: No. 4 Squadron RFC; No. 8 Squadron RFC; No. 16 Squadron RFC; No. 56 Squadron RAF
- Commands: No. 60 Squadron RAF; No. 85 Squadron RAF
- Awards: Military Cross; Distinguished Flying Cross

Wing Commander Cyril Marconi Crowe MC, DFC (6 January 1894 – 31 May 1974) was a World War I flying ace credited with 15 victories.

== Early life ==
Crowe was the only child of Mr. and Mrs. Edward Crowe of Saltburn-by-the-Sea, Yorkshire, He was educated at Mill Hill School from 1907 until 1911.

== World War I service ==
Crowe was granted Aviator's Certificate No. 898 on 8 September 1914 after flying at the Grahame-White Flying School at Hendon Aerodrome. On 1 October, he was commissioned in the Royal Flying Corps as a probationary second lieutenant, was appointed a flying officer on 22 December, and confirmed in his rank on 6 January 1915.

On 24 April 1915, he was promoted to lieutenant. Crowe was appointed a flight commander with the temporary rank of captain on 14 October, and 1 December was promoted from temporary captain to captain.

When the founding Officer Commanding of No. 56 Squadron, Major Richard Blomfield, went recruiting pilots for the new unit, Crowe was chosen on the basis of his skills to be a flight commander. He came aboard as leader of "B" Flight on 19 April 1917. He scored his first victory on 24 April 1917; by 30 April, his count stood at four. Crowe was involved in Albert Ball's last dogfight on 7 May, and was the last British pilot to see Ball still alive. Crowe reported that Ball was last seen flying into a thunderhead. Between 23 May and 16 June, Crowe increased his number of aerial victories by five, to bring his total to nine.

On 26 October 1917 Crowe was appointed a squadron commander, with the temporary rank of major, to serve as an instructor at the Central Flying School, remaining in that post until 21 February 1918, when he also relinquished his temporary rank.

Crowe returned to No. 56 Squadron, accounting for five more enemy aircraft between 18 March and 1 July. Upon James McCudden's death on 9 July, Crowe took over as commander of No. 60 Squadron, with another appointment to the temporary rank of major. By then, his tally stood at 14 victories. On 29 July, he crashed a car into a tree while returning from a party in Dieppe. The accident killed his old schoolmate Owen Scholte, as well as Major Foggin. The resultant court-martial reduced Crowe to the rank of captain for a month. He was then reinstated in the rank of major and given command of No. 85 Squadron. He scored his fifteenth and last victory for them on 16 September 1918.

Crowe's talents as a fighter pilot were described by Arthur Rhys-Davids, one of the pilots in "B" Flight, 56 Squadron: "Crowe is not afraid of anything and goes after old Huns like a rocket and yet he is extraordinarily prudent."

Crowe eventually left the RAF, being transferred to the Unemployed List on 25 September 1919.

== Between the wars ==
Crowe married Elena Temperley at Saint John's Anglican church in Buenos Aires, Argentina, on 21 September 1929. They went on to have four children: Peter, Robin Bettina and Sally

Crowe was granted a commission as a flight lieutenant (and honorary squadron leader) in the Reserve of Air Force Officers on 20 November 1937.

== World War II ==
On 1 September 1939 Crowe relinquished his reserve commission and joined the Royal Air Force Volunteer Reserve as a flight lieutenant, with seniority from 13 March. He rose to the rank of wing commander.

On 24 September 1947 he returned to the Reserve of Air Force Officers with the rank of flight lieutenant, until finally relinquishing his commission on 27 May 1954.

== Honours and awards ==
Military Cross (MC)
Captain Cyril Marconi Crowe, Royal Flying Corps (Special Reserve)
For conspicuous gallantry and skill as a leader of offensive patrols, many times attacking hostile formations single-handed, and descending to low altitudes under heavy anti-aircraft fire. He has been responsible for the destruction of several enemy machines.

Distinguished Flying Cross (DFC)
Captain Cyril Marconi Crowe, MC.
This officer has been engaged on active operations over the lines for over twelve months, and has accounted for ten enemy aeroplanes. He is a most successful leader, distinguished for skill and bravery. On a recent occasion he, accompanied by two other machines, attacked an enemy formation consisting of four biplanes and one triplane. Having destroyed a biplane he engaged the triplane at close range and destroyed that also.
