= Carlo Brandelli =

British artist & designer

Carlo Brandelli (born December 1969) is a British artist and creative director. He received the Menswear Designer of the Year award from the British Fashion Council in 2005.

== Menswear career ==
Brandelli founded Squire in 1991, with the goal of combining elements of art, architecture, and fashion design. He also worked as a freelance designer for Burberry and Valentino in Japan.

In 2003, Brandelli joined Kilgour, a Savile Row tailoring house, as creative director.

Brandelli was named GQ's Most Stylish Man in 2005.

== Artist career ==
In 2009, Brandelli founded an art studio, focusing on sculpture and design consultancy. His first solo sculpture exhibition, titled Permanence, opened in June 2010 at RCM Galerie in Paris, France.

In 2016 he created a sculptural series, titled Left Glass.

In 2016, Brandelli showcased an installation of coloured glass at the Palazzo Medici in Florence, Italy.

In 2022, Brandelli collaborated with artist Ewa Wilczynski on 1000 Breaths, a mixed-media installation that combined painting, sculpture, and performance. It briefly exhibited at Sant'Agostino, Piacenza in Emilia Romagna, Italy.

== General references ==
- "Carlo Brandelli illuminates the internal courtyard of Florence's Medici Palace for Pitti". Wallpaper* Magazine. Archived from the original on 22 June 2015.
- "The Savile Row saviour -Telegraph". The Daily Telegraph. Archived from the original on 21 September 2014.
- "Carlo Brandelli constructs a new flagship and vision for Kilgour on Savile Row". 13 June 2014.
- "Carlo Brandelli". SHOWstudio.
- "Exhibitions & Shows". Wallpaper.
- Sinclair, Charlotte (2011-11-12). "Carlo Brandelli talks personal style".
- "'Everybody is obsessed with the English gent' - Telegraph". The Daily Telegraph.
- "An Artist's Story". 24 November 2011.
- "GQ Awards 2005". 10 April 2012.
- "2005's winner Carlo Brandelli". Heart.
- "THE BRITISH FASHION AWARDS, 2005". 11 November 2005.
- "Fashion Industry Trends". Style.com.
- "See Carlo Brandelli's stunning new installation at Pitti Uomo". GQ. Archived from the original on 3 July 2015.
- "Brandelli's Sculptures". 25 June 2010.
- "Carlo Brandelli, Menswear's High Priest, Lifts The Curtain On His New Venture". Style File blog. Style.com Magazine. 5 January 2010. Archived from the original on 2014-01-16.
- Ella Alexander (25 June 2010). "Brandelli's Sculptures". Vogue.
