= Tommy Nutter =

British tailor (1943–1992)

- Nutter, wearing his own tailoring in the 1970s.
- Born: Thomas Albert Nutter; 17 April 1943; Barmouth, Meirionnydd, Wales
- Died: 17 August 1992 (aged 49); London, England
- Education: Willesden Technical College
- Label: Nutters of Savile Row

Thomas Albert Nutter (17 April 1943 – 17 August 1992) was a British tailor, famous for reinventing the Savile Row suit in the 1960s.

== Biography ==
Tommy Nutter was born Thomas Albert Nutter in Barmouth, Meirionnydd on 17 April 1943, to Christopher Nutter and Dorothy (formerly Banister). He was raised in Edgware, Middlesex, where his father owned a cafe. After the family moved to Kilburn, Tommy and his older brother David (born in Edgware, May 1939) attended Willesden Technical College. Tommy initially studied plumbing, and then architecture, but he abandoned both aged 19 to study tailoring at the Tailor and Cutter Academy.

In the early 1960s, he joined traditional tailors Donaldson, Williamson & Ward. After seven years, in 1969, he joined up with Edward Sexton, to open Nutters of Savile Row at No 35a Savile Row. They were financially backed by Cilla Black and her husband Bobby Willis, Managing Director of the Beatles' Apple Corps Peter Brown, and lawyer James Vallance-White.

The business was an immediate success, as Nutter combined traditional tailoring skills with innovative design. He designed for the Hardy Amies range, and then for the man himself. His clients included his investors, plus Sir Roy Strong, Mick Jagger, Bianca Jagger and Elton John. Nutter was most proud that, for the cover of the Beatles' album Abbey Road in 1969, he dressed three out of the four members: George Harrison chose to be photographed on the road-crossing in denim.

In the 1970s, Nutter's bespoke business became less successful, but he branched out into ready to wear clothing, marketed through Austin Reed. He also successfully expanded into East Asia, establishing the Savile Row brand in Japan. In 1976 Sexton bought Nutter out of the business. Nutter went to work for Kilgour French and Stanbury, managing his own workroom. Sexton continued to run Nutters of Savile Row until 1983, when Nutter returned to the row with a ready to wear shop: "Tommy Nutter, Savile Row". This new venture, which traded at No 19 Savile Row until Nutter's death, was backed by J&J Crombie Limited, who continue to own the "Tommy Nutter" trademark. At this time, Sexton set up a business in his own name.

In the 1980s, he described his suits as a "cross between the big-shouldered Miami Vice look and the authentic Savile Row." He created the clothing of the Joker as seen in the 1989 film Batman.

Nutter contracted HIV sometime in the late 1980s, but kept his illness a secret for several years, staying out of the public eye. He died on 17 August 1992 at the age of 49, at the Cromwell Hospital in London of AIDS-related complications at a time when there were no effective treatments or care for people with AIDS.

In 2018, House of Nutter: The Rebel Tailor of Savile Row, a biography of Nutter, with reminiscences by his brother David, a New York celebrity photographer, was published; it was written by Lance Richardson.
