= Gieves & Hawkes =

Bespoke men's tailor located at 1 Savile Row, London

Coordinates: 51.5102°N 0.1397°W

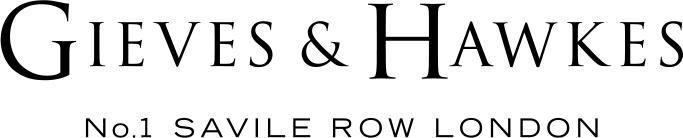
- Type: Private
- Industry: Clothing
- Founded: 1771; 255 years ago
- Founders: Thomas Hawkes; James Watson Gieve
- Headquarters: 1 Savile Row; London, W1; United Kingdom
- Number of locations: 45 stores in 25 cities (March 2020)
- Products: Menswear
- Owner: Frasers Group
- Website: gievesandhawkes.com

Gieves & Hawkes (/ˈɡiːvz/) is a luxury bespoke men's tailor and menswear retailer located at 1 Savile Row in London, England. The business was founded in 1771. It was acquired in 2012 by the Hong Kong conglomerate Trinity Ltd., which was in turn purchased by Shandong Ruyi in 2017. After Trinity was subject to a winding-up petition for debt in September 2021, Gieves & Hawkes was acquired in November 2022 by Frasers Group, owner of Sports Direct.

Gieves & Hawkes is one of the oldest bespoke tailoring companies in the world. The business was originally based on catering to the needs of the British Army and the Royal Navy, and hence by association the British royal family. The company holds a number of royal warrants, and it provides men's ready-to-wear as well as bespoke and military tailoring. The current design director is Joshua Scacheri.

== History ==
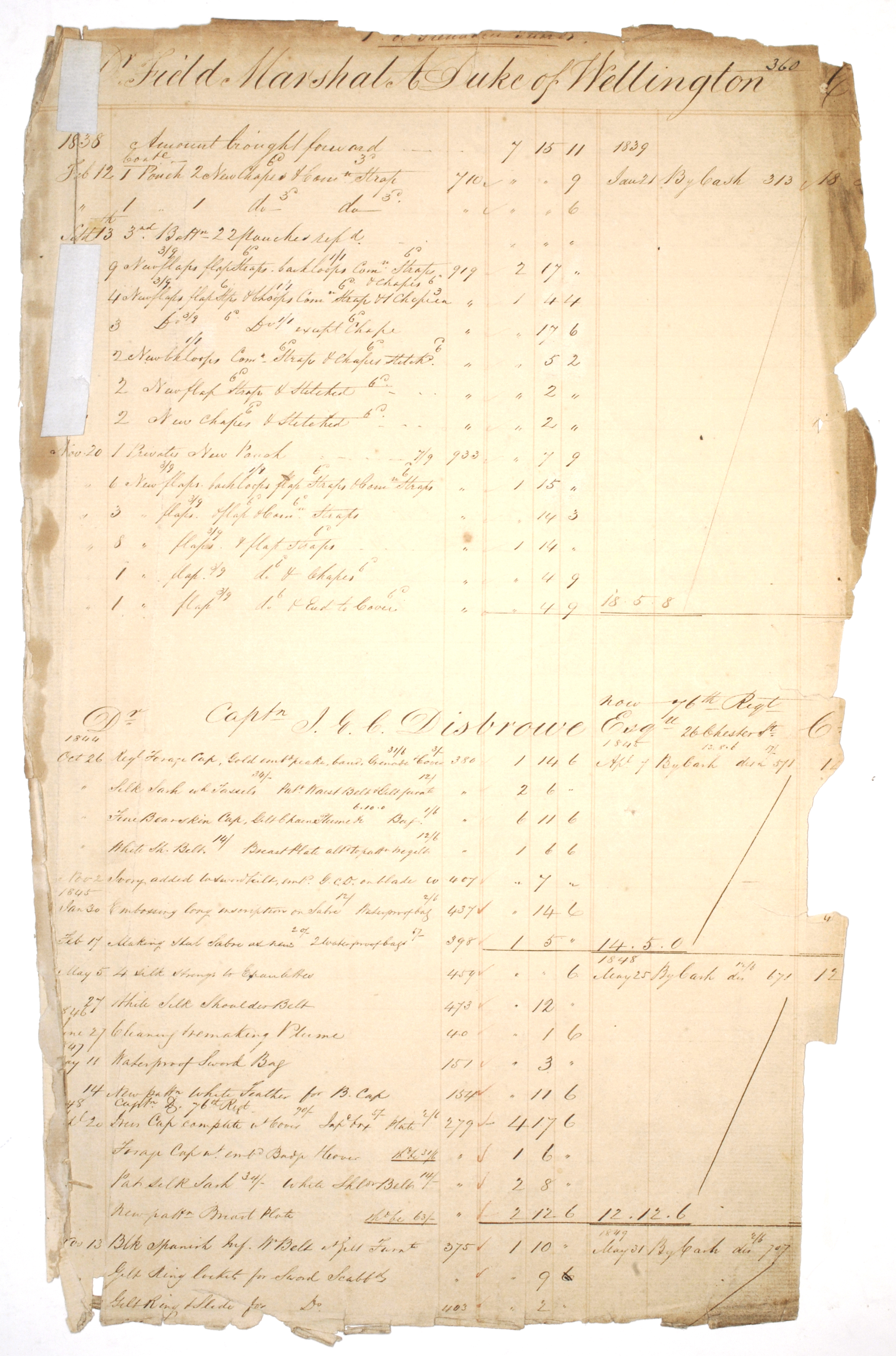
Hawkes customer ledger for 1837, with entries for Field Marshal The Duke of Wellington (on behalf of the 33rd Regiment of Foot)

After coming to London in 1760, Thomas Hawkes established his first shop in 1771 in Brewer Street, selling to gentlemen. His main clients were commanders of the British Army, through which King George III became a customer. He expanded his retail operation by moving to No.17 (later number No.14) Piccadilly in 1793, where he gained the first of many Royal Warrants in 1809.

In 1835, 15 year old James Watson Gieve was employed by Augustus Meredith, a Portsmouth-based tailor by appointment to the Royal Navy. In 1852, Gieve partnered with Joseph Galt, whose father John had taken over Meredith's business and in 1887, Gieve purchased the remaining shares to form Gieves & Co. He died in 1888.

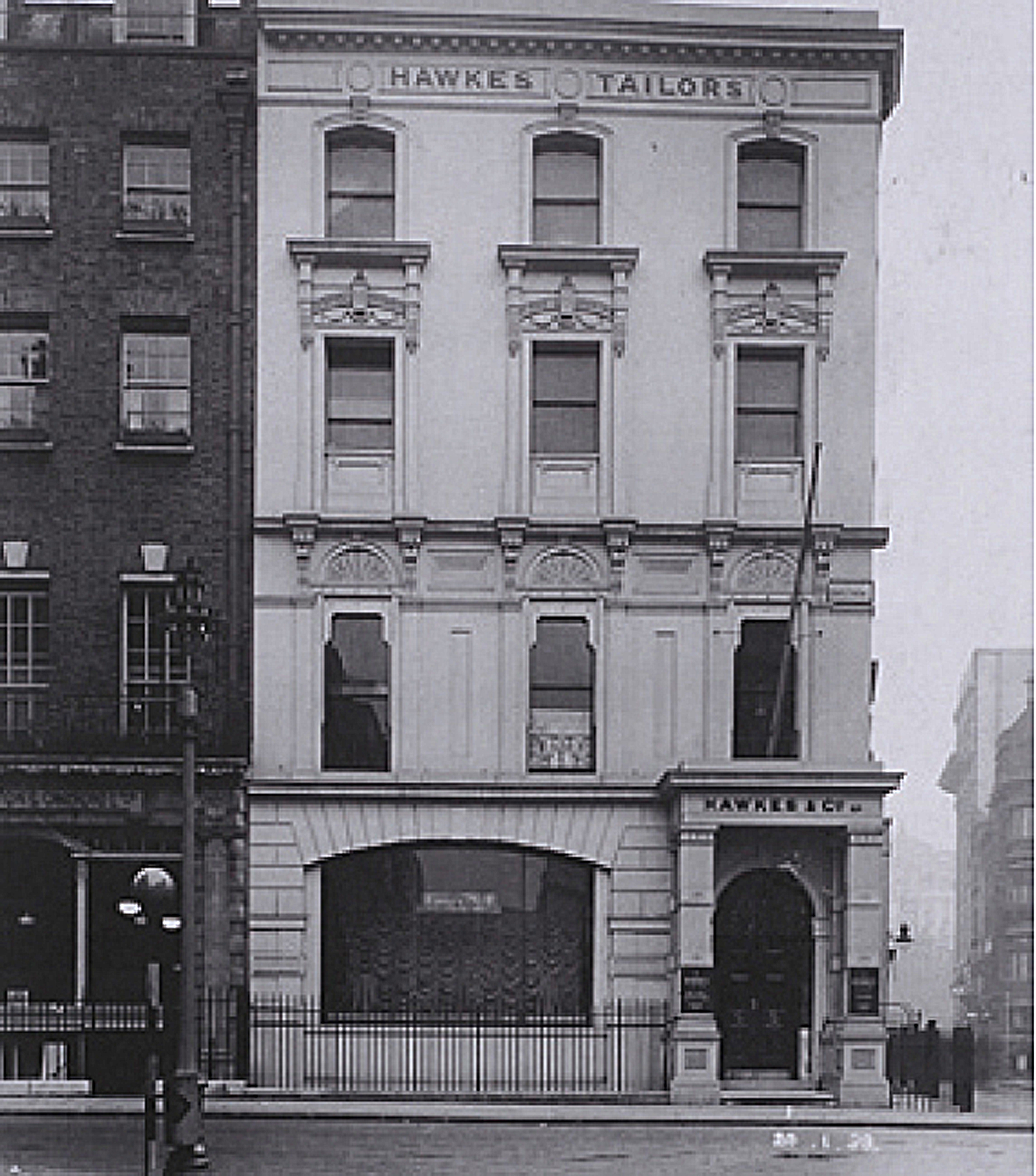
Hawkes & Co. at Savile Row in 1936

On 23 December 1912, Hawkes & Co. bought №1 Savile Row from the Royal Geographical Society for £38,000, in part because the firm had dressed so many explorers. In 1974, Gieves Ltd acquired Hawkes & Co., and the freehold of 1 Savile Row. The company was renamed Gieves & Hawkes. In 2009, Kathryn Sargent of Gieves and Hawkes became the first female head cutter in Savile Row. The company also produces the uniforms for the Honourable Corps of Gentlemen at Arms. Gieves & Hawkes celebrated its 250th anniversary in 2021.

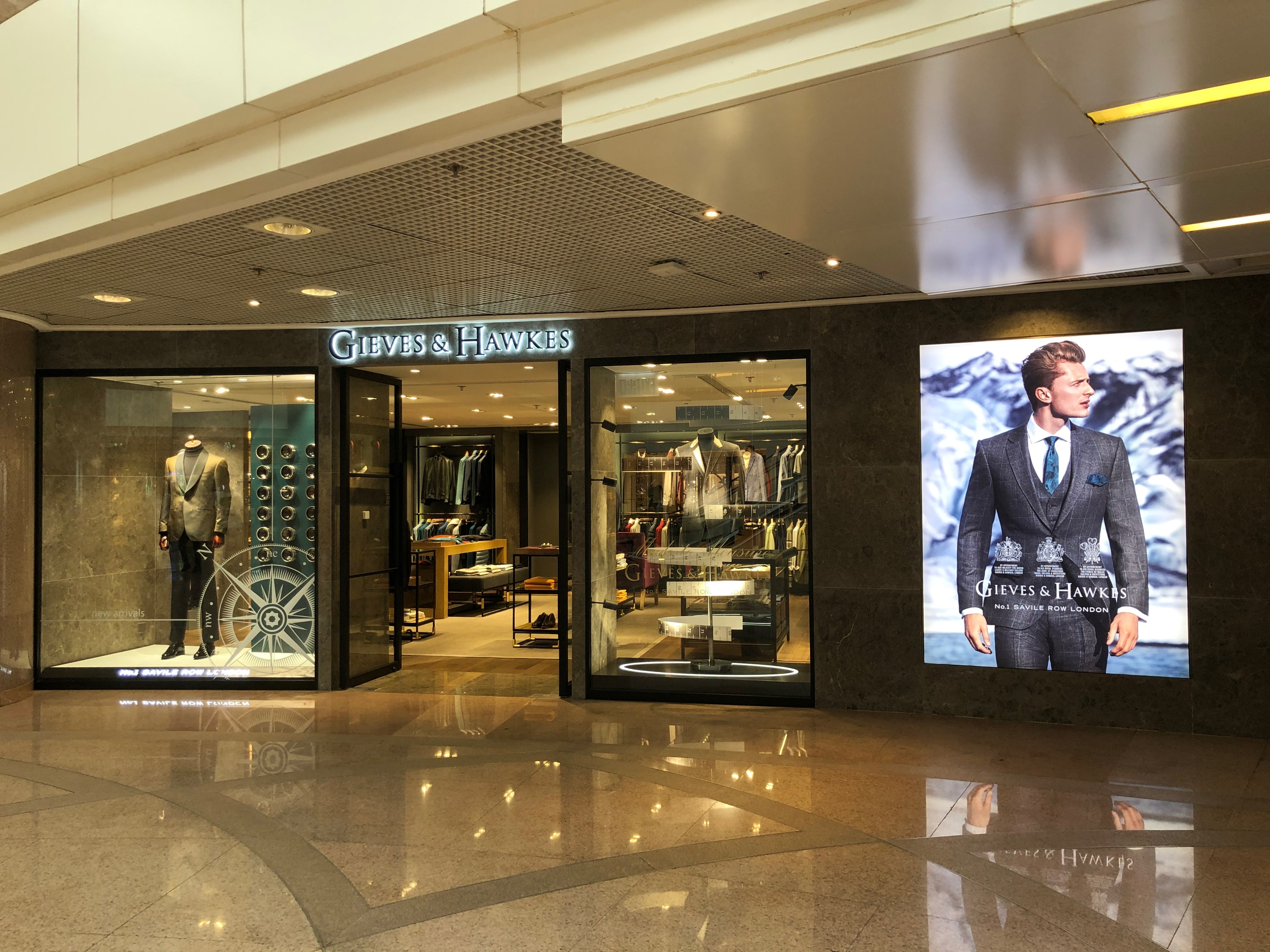
Gieves & Hawkes store in Harbour City, Hong Kong

The company was bought by Hong Kong-based property developer and garment manufacturer USL Holdings Ltd in 2002, having listed unsuccessfully as a Plc. In May 2012, Gieves & Hawkes was acquired by Trinity Limited, and the distribution of Gieves & Hawkes continues to expand with 68 stores and concessions around the UK and in Hong Kong, China, and Taiwan. In June 2009, Gieves & Hawkes began a new partnership with British Formula One team Brawn GP, providing the team with their official attire, a grey, single-breasted, two-button, mohair suit, white shirt, and distinctive team-coloured tie.

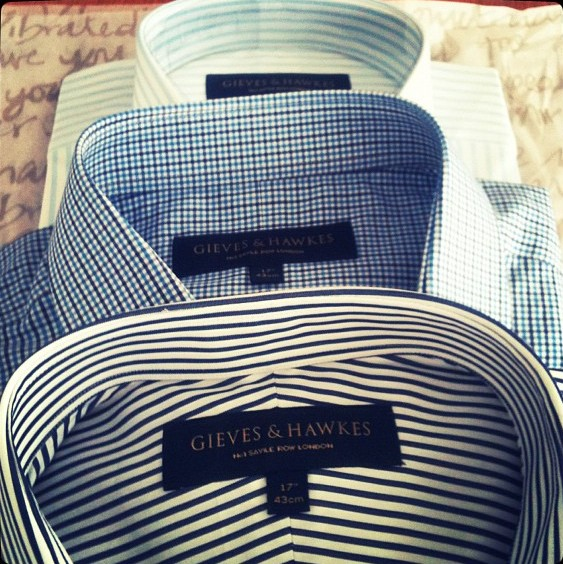
Three Gieves & Hawkes shirts

The Savile Row flagship store was renovated in 2011 and transformed into a menswear emporium, which includes concessions for Carréducker, a British bespoke shoemaker. In October 2011, Gieves & Hawkes sponsored the Scott-Amundsen Centenary Race conducted by six serving soldiers of the British Army, with all proceeds going to the Royal British Legion. The Savile Row flagship store was renovated in 2026 and reopened on 1 September 2026.

== Retail locations ==
Country/Region	Australia	China		France	Japan	Taiwan	United Kingdom
City	(Australia) Melbourne (Australia) Sydney	(China) Beijing (China) Changchun (China) Changsha (China) Chengdu (China) Guangzhou (China) Guiyang (China) Haikou Hong Kong	(China) Huizhou Macau (China) Shanghai (China) Suzhou (China) Taiyuan (China) Wuhan (China) Xi'an (China) Xiamen	(France) Paris	(Japan) Nagoya (Japan) Osaka (Japan) Tokyo	(Taiwan) Kaohsiung (Taiwan) Taichung (Taiwan) Taipei (Taiwan) Taoyuan (Taiwan) Tainan	(England) Bath (England) Birmingham (England) Chester (England) London Savile Row (England) Winchester

== Collaborations ==
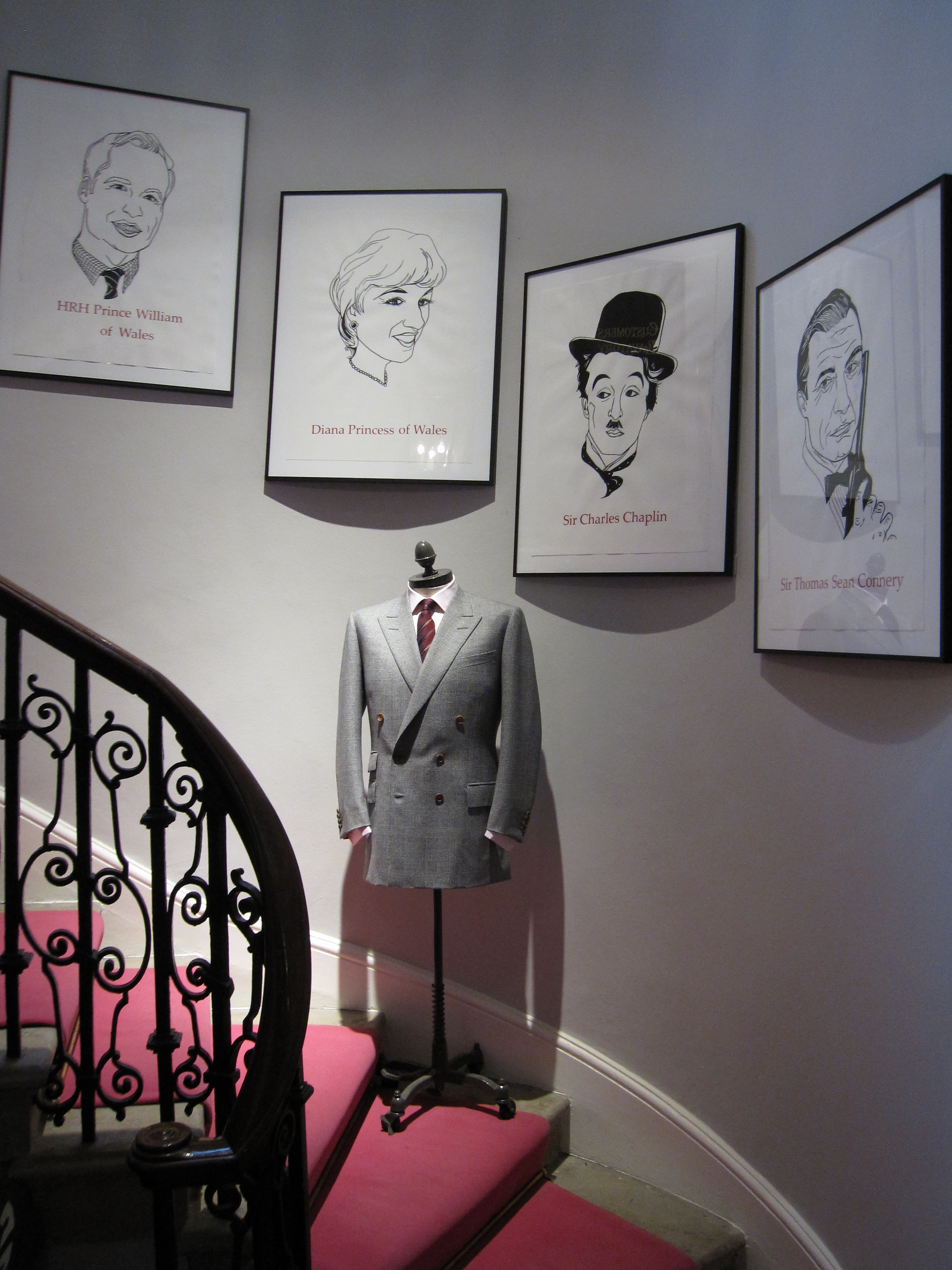
Drawings of some of the customers of Gieves & Hawkes on Savile Row, such as the Duke of Cambridge, Diana, Princess of Wales, Charlie Chaplin, and Sean Connery

- 2010 – Sponsored Formula 1 team Mercedes GP Petronas and created a Mercedes capsule collection of personal tailoring and accessories.
- 2011 – British shoes and accessories house Harrys of London has launched a collection of exclusive footwear as part of a collaboration with bespoke tailoring house Gieves & Hawkes.
- Since November 2012 – Joined Pennies and allowed customers to donate to charity when paying for goods by card across its UK stores.
- November 2019 – British watch distributor Zeon launched a new collection as part of the partnership, the first edition was only available to buy at 1 Savile Row.
- November 2019 – Luxury leather goods manufacturer Ettinger launched The Ettinger Accessories Room to showcase accessories and bags at 1 Savile Row.

== Royal warrants ==
Gieves & Hawkes have a strong history of service to the military and to the British royal family. Hawkes & Co. were granted their first Royal Warrant in 1809, during the reign of King George III. Gieves & Hawkes held a warrant by appointment to King Charles III when he was Prince of Wales. The company previously held warrants by appointment to Queen Elizabeth II and Prince Philip, Duke of Edinburgh.

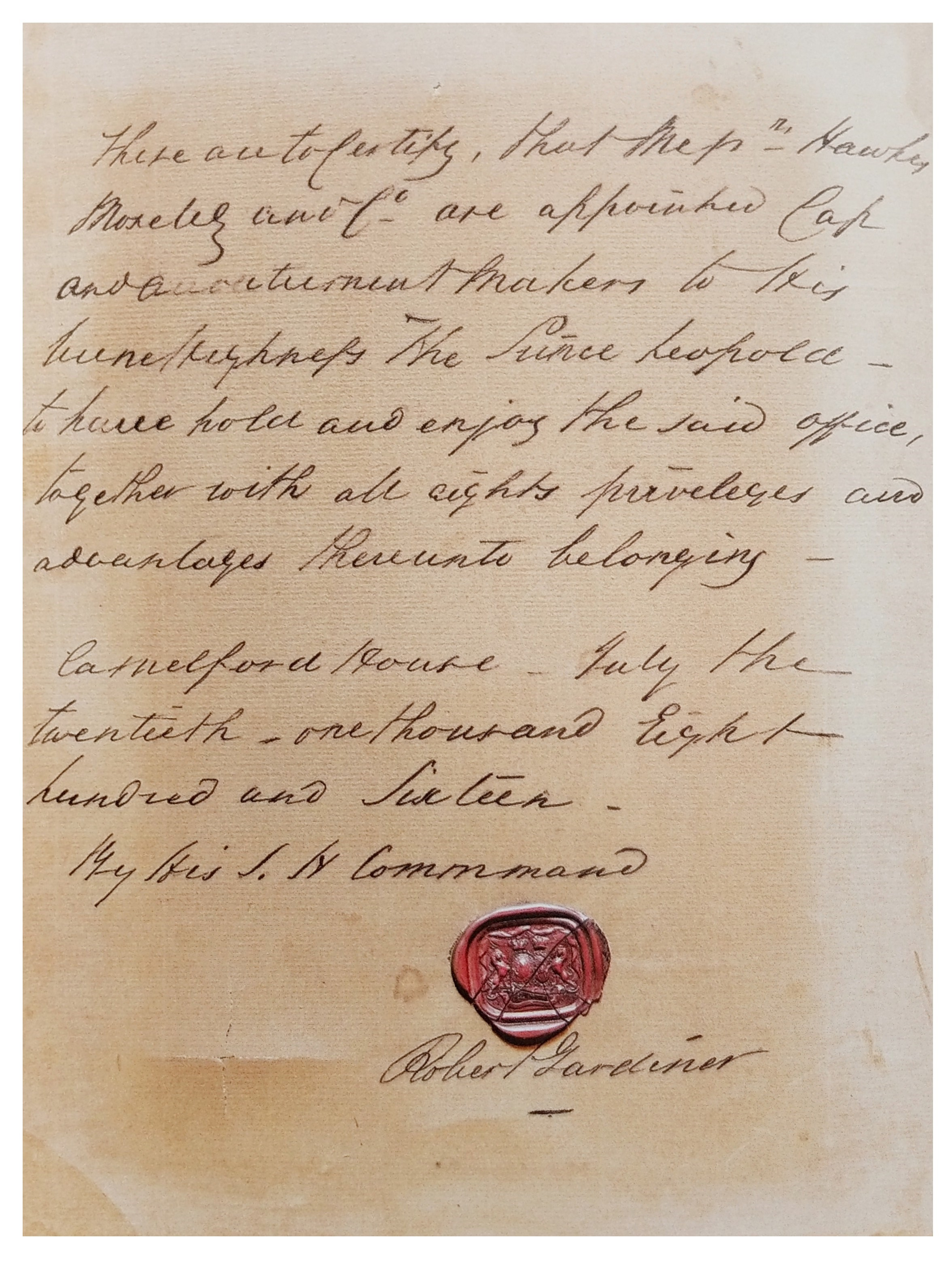
Original warrant granted by Prince Leopold to Hawkes, Moseley & Co. in 1816

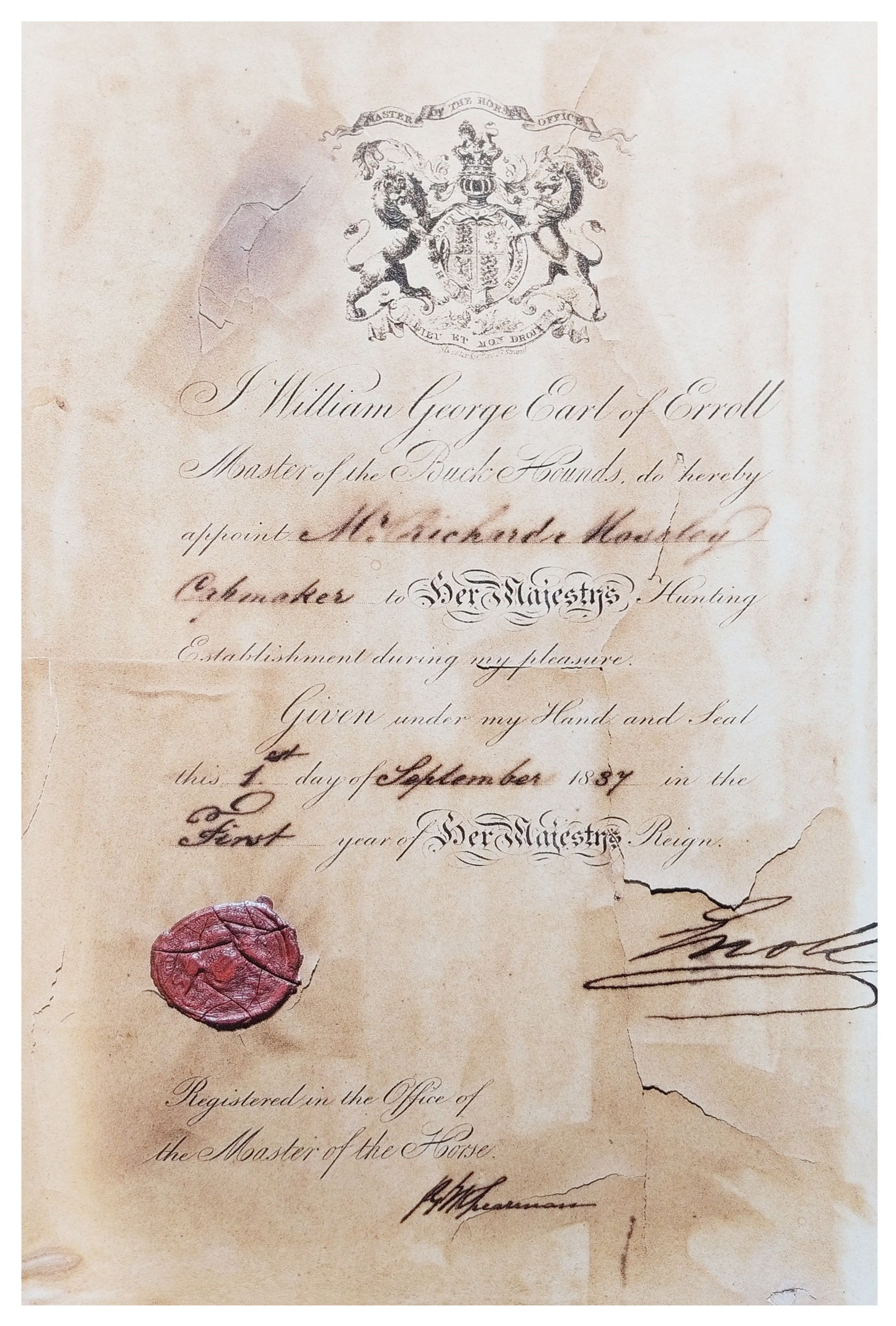
Original warrant granted by Queen Victoria to Richard Moseley of Hawkes, Moseley & Co. in 1837

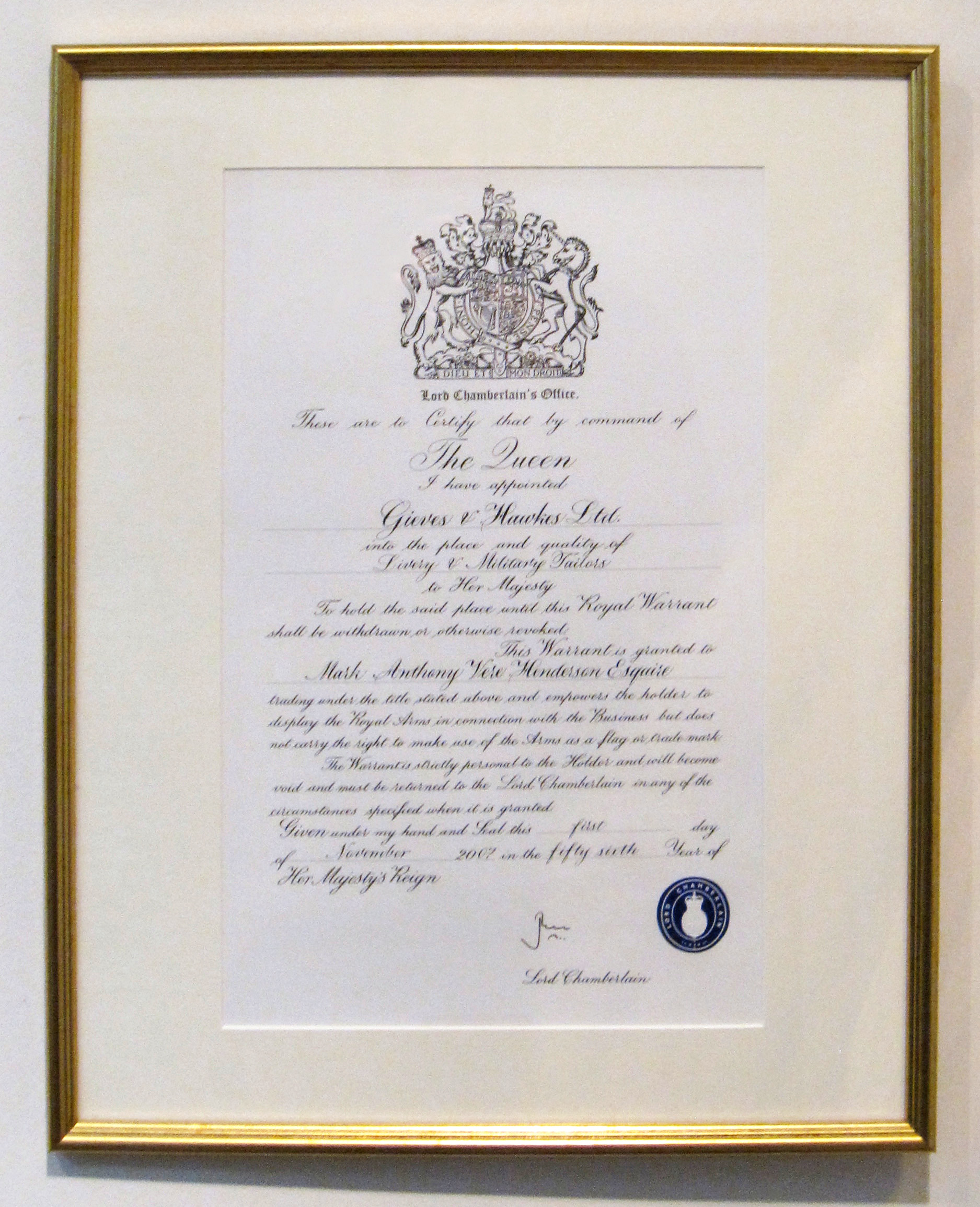
Royal Warrant of Appointment by Queen Elizabeth II granted in 2007

== Timeline ==
- 1732 – Number One Savile Row constructed as town house of the Fairfax family.
- 1760 – Thomas Hawkes comes to London, and is employed as a journeyman (a runner) for Mr Moy, a velvet cap-maker on Swallow Street. Heavy drinking Moy leaves the socially aware Hawkes to cultivate his royal clientele.
- 1771 – With Moy dead, Hawkes sets up a hatter and tailor shop in Brewer Street. His top client was King George III, who later ordered several thousand scarlet uniforms for the British army, and his son the Prince Regent (the future George IV).
- 1793 – Hawkes has established his expanded shop at No.17 (later number No.14) Piccadilly, described as "Helmet, Hat and Cap-maker to the King."
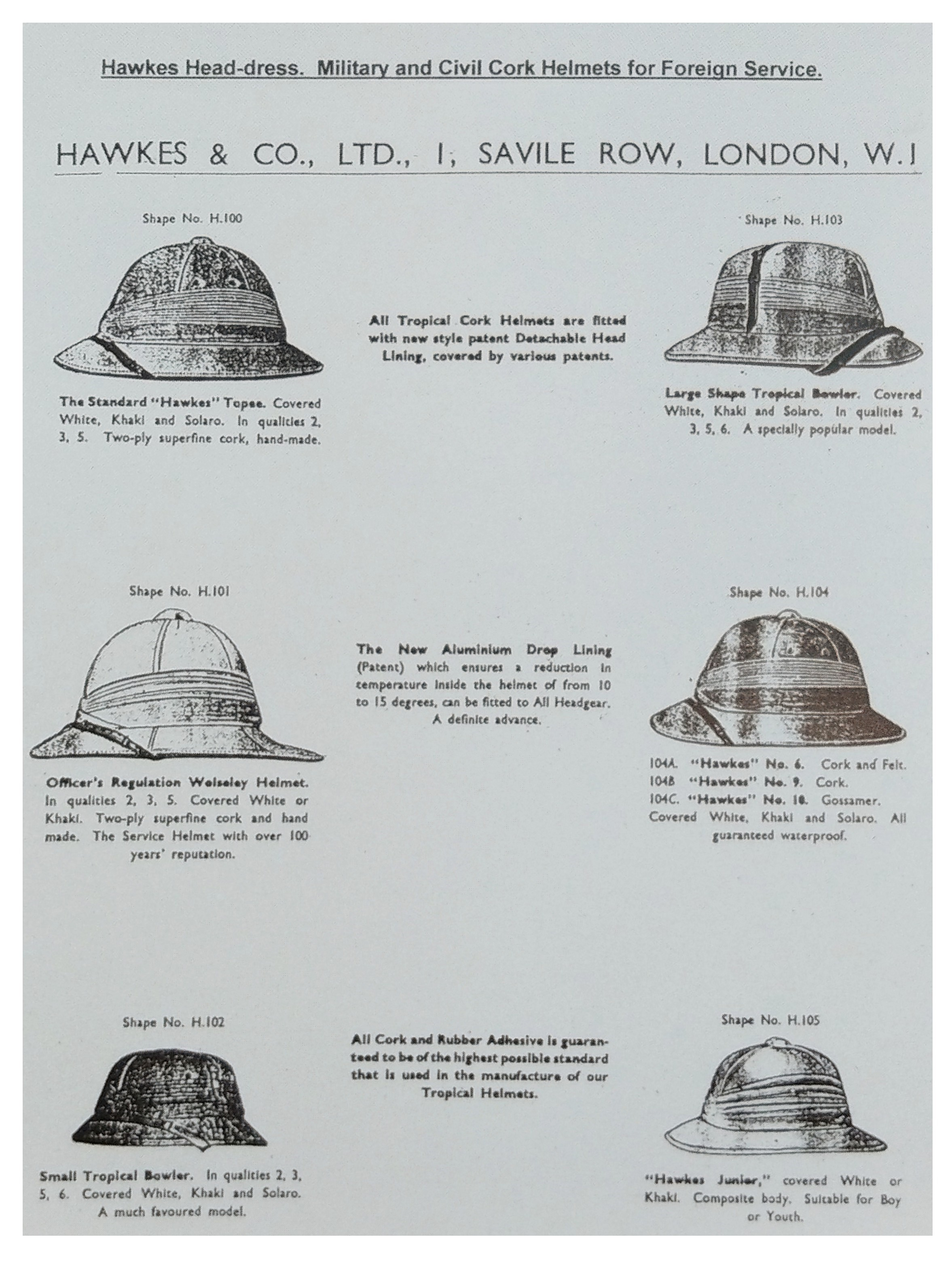
  Advertisement for cork helmets by Hawkes & Co. at the time of the First World War.
- 1809 – Thomas Hawkes receives his first Royal Warrant, based on his work for George III.
- 1818 – Burlington Arcade, a glassed-over esplanade of shops adjacent to Burlington House is constructed under the patronage of Lord George Cavendish who resides at No 1 Savile Row, where Beau Brummell was a guest before his fall and exile in 1814.
- 1822 – James Watson Gieve is born in Chulmleigh, Devon.
- 1850 – Having handed his business over to his nephews, by 1850 Hawkes & Co is being run by H. T. White. As the personal tailor of Sir Garnet Wolseley, he develops a special form of the pith helmet known as the Wolseley pattern, which has an extended brim at the rear for better sun protection for the neck. It is still worn today by the Royal Marines as formal dress.
- 1835 – James Watson Gieve is employed by 'Old Mel' Meredith, a Portsmouth-based tailor by appointment to the Royal Navy. Meredith tailors the uniform Admiral Lord Nelson is wearing when killed in action aboard HMS Victory at the Battle of Trafalgar.
- 1852 – James Gieve acquires a partnership with Joseph Galt (established in 1823 and incorporating Meredith); christening the firm Galt & Gieves.
- 1871 – Ownership of №1 passed to the Royal Geographical Society, which added the Map Room and galleried Library which remain the focal point of the interiors today. Henry Morton Stanley, sent to search for David Livingstone by the New York Herald newspaper in 1869, finds him in the town of Ujiji on the shores of Lake Tanganyika on 27 October 1871, clad in Hawkes & Co. dress from head to toe.
- 1873 – the body of explorer David Livingstone lies in state at 1 Savile Row, before burial at Westminster Abbey.
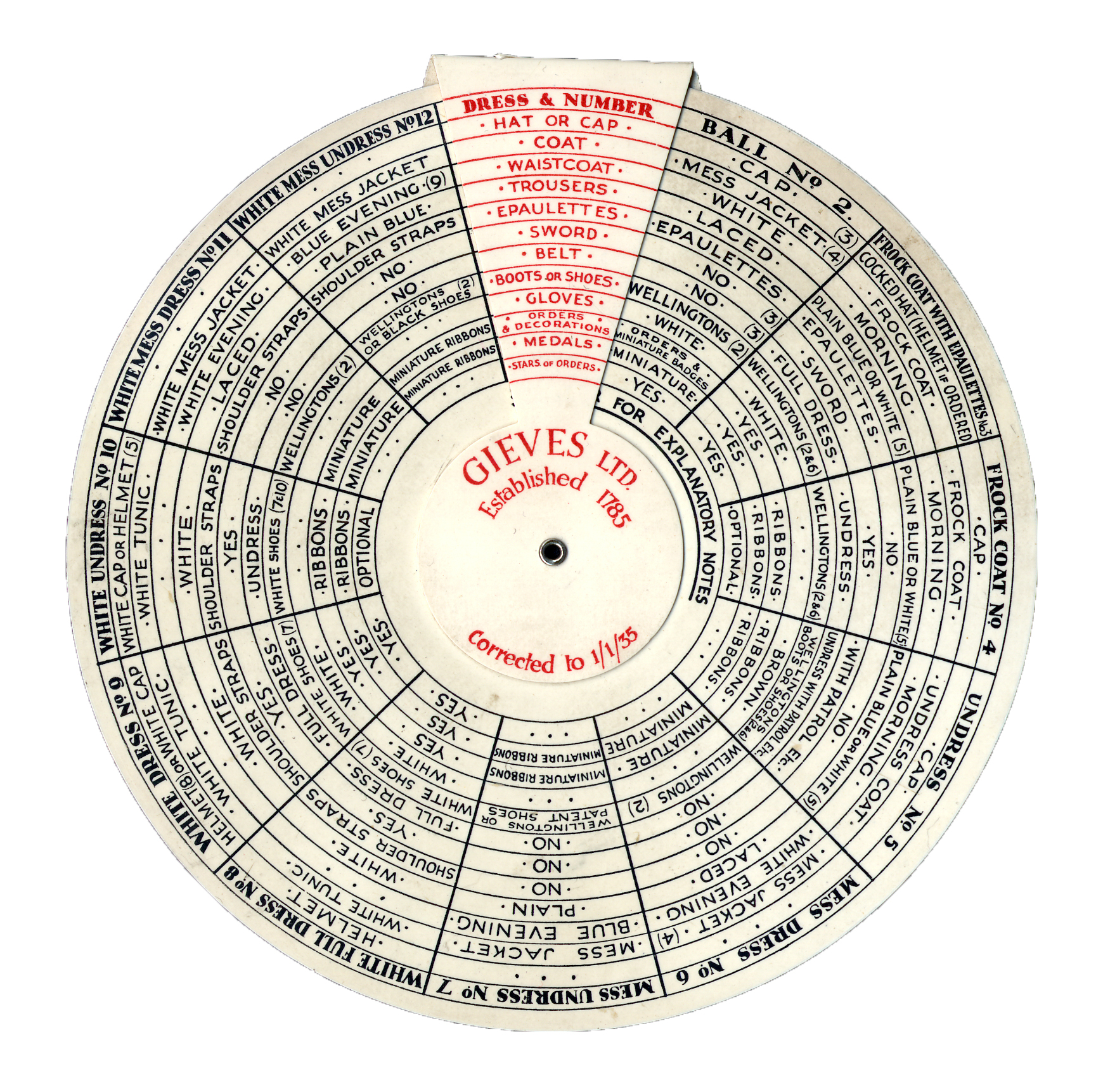
  Dress indicator developed by Gieves Ltd. for naval officers to select the correct components of uniform
- 1887 – James Gieve becomes sole owner of Galt & Gieves, renaming it Gieves & Co.
- 1888 – James Gieve dies.
- 1912 – On 23 December, №1 Savile Row is purchased from the Royal Geographical Society by Hawkes & Co. for £38,000, in part because the firm has dressed so many explorers. This was at a time when the international reputation of Savile Row, the famous street and centre for fine craft tailoring was growing. Another £10,000 is spent on converting the premises to suit the business. Hawkes & Co. is appointed to dress the Honourable Corps of Gentlemen at Arms, the British Monarch's nearest bodyguard.
- 1920s – becomes the first Savile Row tailor to make and (secretly) sell ready-to-wear suits.
- 1935 – a period uniform is made for actor Charles Laughton for his role as Captain Bligh in the film Mutiny on the Bounty. Moy had made uniforms for the original Captain Bligh.
- 1955 – Gieves is depicted in the film The Man Who Never Was when a German/Irish agent tries to verify the existence of the title character.
- 1974 – Gieves Ltd acquires Hawkes, and the precious freehold of No 1 Savile Row. The company is renamed Gieves & Hawkes.
- 1980s – licenses Rochester, New York based manufacturer Hickey Freeman to produce a licensed version of its clothes for distribution in North America.
- 1987–89 – Michael Jackson wore the tailcoat made by Gieves & Hawkes during his Bad World Tour.
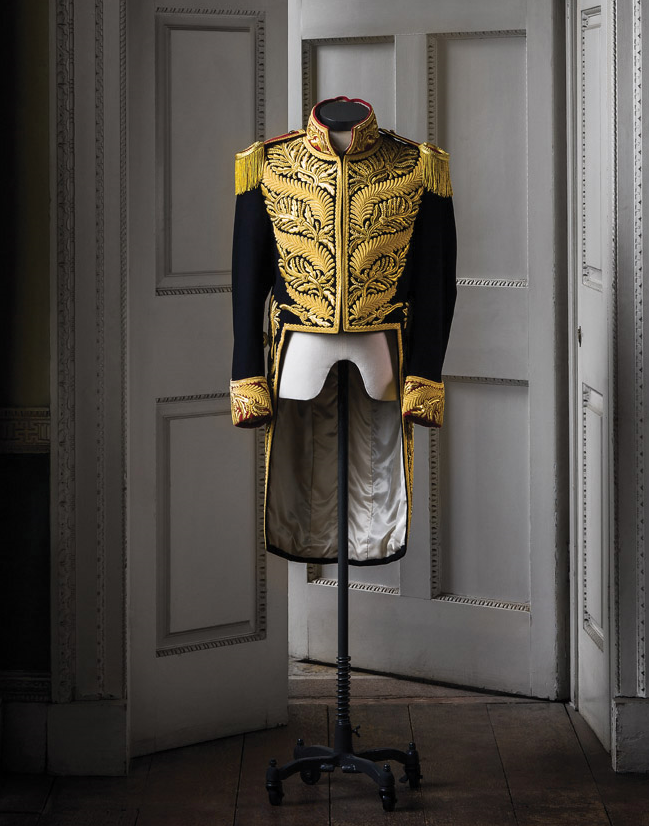
  Tailcoat made for Michael Jackson for this Bad World Tour of 1987–89. The style is based on the 1930s civil uniform worn at court together with some military-inspired details.
- 2002 – Following a very poor 2001–02 trading period where it lost £1 million, Gieves & Hawkes plc accepts an offer from Hong Kong's USI Holdings Limited, valuing the company at £11.5million.
- 2007 – Robert Gieve, the fifth and last generation of the family to serve Gieves & Hawkes, dies.
- 2011 – Major refurbishment for the Savile Row flagship store, with new concessions such as bespoke shoemaking and barbershop.
- 2012 – Sold to Trinity Ltd and continue to expand in China, Hong Kong and Taiwan.
- 2017 – John Harrison became Creative Director.
- 2021 – Trinity Ltd subject to winding-up petition.
- 2022 – Acquired by Frasers Group.
