= Drape suit =

20th century British three-piece suit style

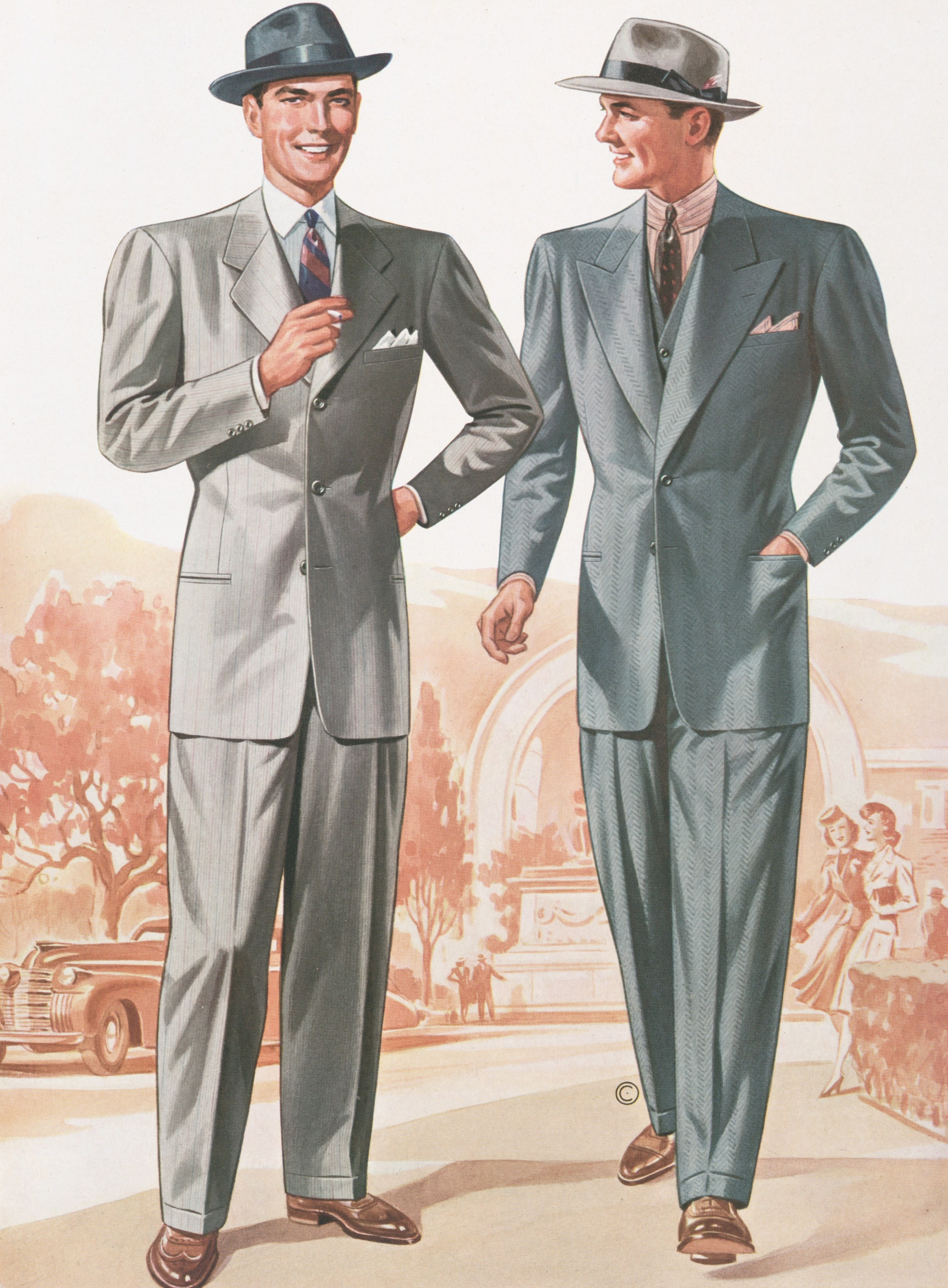
Fashion illustration of three-button drape and two-button drape suits, 1940–41

Drape suits are a British variation of the three-piece suit introduced in the 1930s, in which the cut is full and "drapes". It is also known as the blade cut or London cut. The design of the athletic aesthetic of the drape suit is attributed to the London tailor Frederick Scholte.

The new suit cut was softer and more flexible in construction than the suits of the previous generation; extra fabric in the shoulder and armscye, light padding, a slightly nipped waist, and fuller sleeves tapered at the wrist resulted in a cut with folds, or "drapes," front and back that created the illusion of the broad-shoulders and tight-waist "V" figure of the very fit.

== Historical background ==
Most changes in menswear occur slowly and subtly, until the shift becomes noticeably different. This noticeably different change occurs some time after the transition had begun. In comparison, changes in women's fashions are fast and each alteration noticeable almost immediately as it occurs. English tailoring remained the norm in leading men's fashions with a heavy influence of sportswear.

== 1920s–1930s ==
Introduced in the late 1920s, the athletic silhouette in suits "gradually and subtly refined into the drape cut". The athletic cut was more comfortable and less fitted to allow for movement. Previously, they were considered informal and not suitable for everyday dress on the streets. During the early 1900s, there was a shift of attitudes, and the clothes that were considered informal or for sports were being worn on the streets and were considered acceptable wear. The English drape suit became popular by the late 1930s. Edward VIII often wore the drape cut and in doing so helped to spread its popularity to America.

Frederick Scholte's distinctive V-shaped suit was developed through "discreet horizontal drapes narrowed across the shoulder blades from the roomy armholes down to the raised waistline". This shape resembled a 'V', which was caused by the broad shoulders that narrowed to a tucked in waistline, which smoothed over the hips as opposed to flaring back out (like the tail coat or the frock coat that preceded it). The shoulders were not padded, looking natural, broad and masculine. The drape suit was a more comfortable, athletic alternative to the slim suits of the preceding war years and their restrictions. It had more fabric through the shoulders and chest, causing a slight drape or wrinkle. Like other suit jackets, this style could be made single or double-breasted. The pants were also cut fuller "with pleated fronts and wide legs that tapered slightly to the ankle".

== Variations: American drape suit versus British drape suit ==
The main difference between American and British versions of the drape suit was in the treatment of the sleeve-head at the shoulderline. The American version had a "smooth roll of sleeve fabric where it was stitched into the armscye" whereas the English version had "tiny puckers from stitch tucks". In addition, the American drape suit has a very tapered waist that helps to exaggerate the bulk in the chest and shoulders, and causes the skirt line to appear flared. In comparison, the English version has a less tapered waist with a straight skirt line.

== Drape suit in the mid-20th century ==
By the mid-1930s, "two subtle changes added a touch of modernity to the athletic suit style". The first modification was the alteration of the peaked lapel, which became wider and angled more upwards. This added more fullness and width to the 'masculine' chest. The second modification was the alteration of the sleeve armholes to become more narrow and raised. This added more fullness and width for a 'masculine' impact in the broadness of the shoulders and narrow waist.

The drape suit remained popular during World War II, being a familiar and stable piece during uncertain times. A man's shoulders remained broad, fluid and natural; his chest appeared full and muscular "with the deeply rolled lapels"; "his waist and hips were made trim with the raised coat waistline and ventless skirt".

In the 1950s, men's fashions followed the trend of women's. With Christian Dior's New Look for women, came the Bold Look and Continental Cut for men. The Bold Look was the continuation of the English drape cut with greater emphasis on the coordination of the suit with its accessories and shirt. It continued to have broad shoulders with a slightly nipped in waist and a double-breasted suit jacket. This cut was anchored in the WWII version, without the war restrictions.

== Late 20th century ==
In the 1974 film The Great Gatsby, the drape suit of the 1920s and 1930s was revisited. The suit was modernized with the use of synthetic fabrics and a more modern construction.

Recently, Michael Anton, author of The Suit, has advocated for the return of the drape suit. The American Zoot suit is an extreme exaggeration of excess fabric.
