= Dege & Skinner =

English bespoke tailor and shirt-maker

Coordinates: 51.5108°N 0.1400°W

J. Dege & Sons Limited
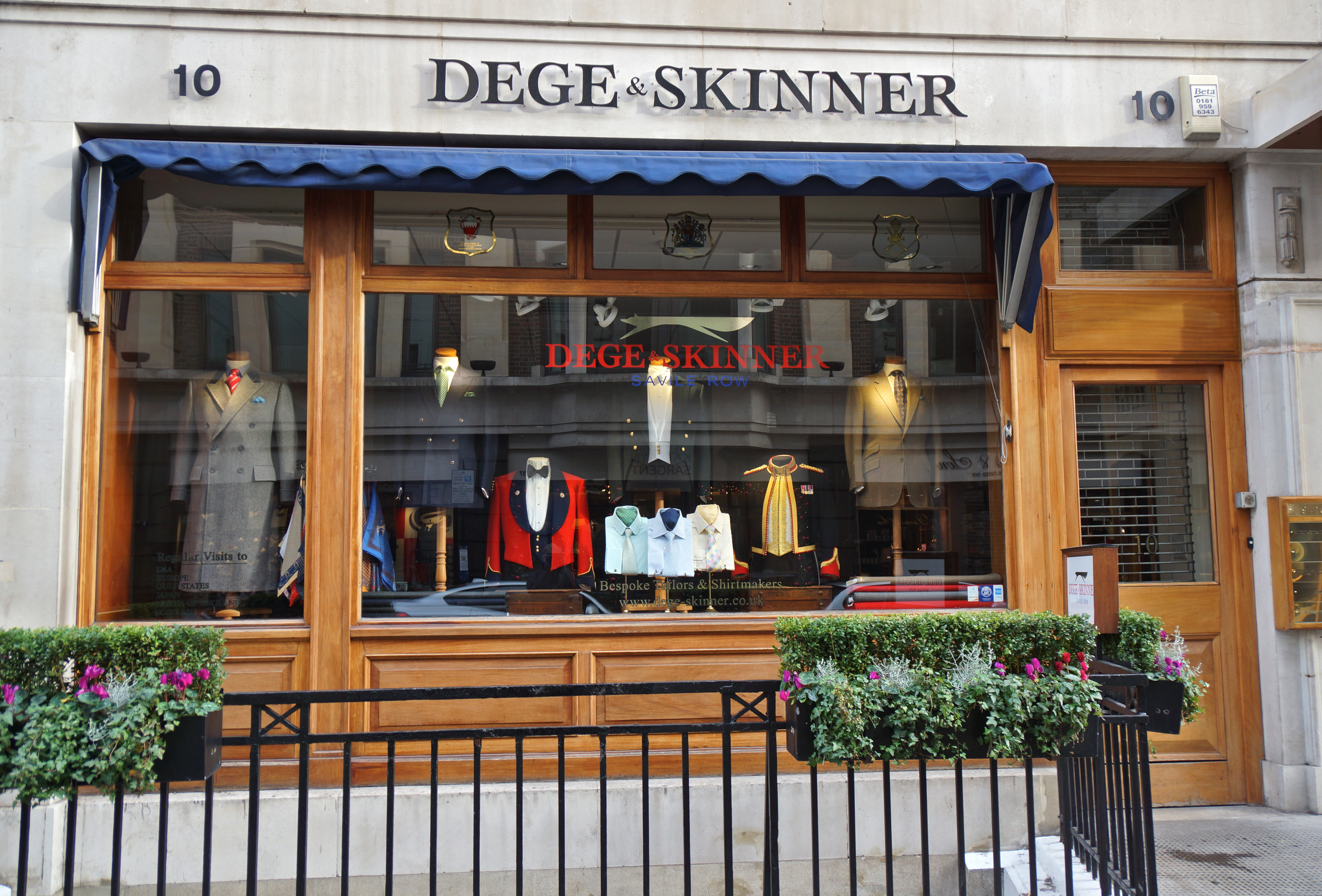
- Trade name: Dege & Skinner
- Company type: Private limited company
- Industry: Bespoke tailoring
- Founded: 1865; 161 years ago
- Headquarters: 10 Savile Row; London, England
- Key people: Michael Skinner (chairman); William Skinner (managing director); Nicholas De'Ath (creative director)
- Products: Menswear
- Owner: Skinner family
- Website: dege-skinner.co.uk

Dege & Skinner is an English bespoke gentleman's tailor and shirt-maker located at 10 Savile Row, London. Founded in 1865, they are one of the oldest, continually operated bespoke tailoring companies in the world. They have the Row's first and only permanent on-site, bespoke shirt service.

The company has obtained three royal warrants of appointment: Queen Elizabeth II (1984), the Sultan of Oman (1981), and the King of Bahrain (2003). The firm provides bespoke and military tailoring, as well as selling a ready-to-wear collection, with almost half of their customers residing overseas.

== History ==
Dege & Skinner's business was originally based on catering for the needs of the British Army and the Royal Navy, and hence by association with the British royal family.

During the Coronation of Queen Elizabeth II in 1953, Dege & Skinner dressed the Peers of the Realm at Westminster Abbey.

=== Timeline ===
- 1865 - Founded as J.Dege & Sons.
- 1916 - William Skinner Jr., known as 'Tim', joins the firm; he would later take over the business.
- 1928 - Dege & Skinner starts to host trunk shows in the North of England and Scotland.
- 1953 - Dege & Skinner dress Peers of the Realm for The Queen's Coronation in June.
- 1953 - 'Tim' Skinner became Grantee of a Royal Warrant from HM Queen Elizabeth II.
- 1956 - Current Chairman Michael Skinner awarded a First Class Merit Diploma in 'Tailoring Gentleman's Garments'.
- 1957 - Current Chairman Michael Skinner starts his cutting course on Gentleman's Garments at the Tailor & Cutter Academy.
- 1964 - Current Chairman Michael Skinner's first overseas visit to see customers in the USA, a practice which continues to this day.
- 1967 - Purchase of tailoring business 'Rogers, John Jones Ltd'.
- 1970 - Michael Skinner appointed Managing Director of Dege & Skinner.
- 1974 - Golden Shears bi-annual tailoring trade competition launches in the UK.
- 1975 - Dege & Skinner's 'Delta Line' suit style launches at the 16th World Congress of Master Tailors in Rome.
- 1977 - Dege & Skinner signs its first design contract in Japan.
- 1985 - Dege & Skinner designs and makes uniforms for the first camel mounted pipe band of The Royal Oman Police.
- 1988 - John Dege retires.
- 1989 - Company relocates to 10 Savile Row, its current trading location.
- 1992 - William G Skinner, Michael Skinner's son, joins the family business.
- 1994 - Dege & Skinner launches Savile Row's first permanent bespoke shirt-cutting service inside the shop at 10 Savile Row.
- 1997 - William G Skinner elected to the Board of Directors.
- 2000 - Trading name changed from J.Dege & Sons Ltd to Dege & Skinner.
- 2000 - Michael Skinner elected President of the Royal Warrant Holders Association.
- 2001 - William G Skinner appointed Managing Director, fifth generation of the Skinner family to work in the tailoring trade; Michael Skinner becomes Chairman.
- 2003 - Licensing contract signed with Ohga Co. Ltd to make and sell Dege & Skinner branded clothing under license in Japan. Continues to this day.
- 2004 - Michael Skinner appointed Master of the Worshipful Company of Merchant Taylors, first practising tailor to be elected to the position for more than 350 years.
- 2004 - Savile Row Bespoke Association (SRBA) launches, Dege & Skinner is a Founding Member.
- 2008 - Michael Skinner appointed President of the Windsor, Eton & District Royal Warrant Holders Association (until 2009)
- 2009 - William Skinner succeeds his father in becoming Grantee of the Royal Warrant to Her Majesty The Queen, specifically for the uniforms of The Queen's Body Guard of the Yeoman of the Guard.
- 2011 - 'The Savile Row Cutter' book about Michael Skinner's career as a Master Tailor published by Bene Factum Publishing Ltd.
- 2014 - Dege & Skinner starts selling ready-to-wear, alongside bespoke tailoring and shirt-making.
- 2016 - William Skinner appointed Chairman of Savile Row Bespoke Association, until 2021.
- 2016 - Safari suit made in 1923 for actor Rudolph Valentino fetched $20,000 at Bonham’s film memorabilia auction titled ‘Lights, Camera, Auction’.
- 2018 - Prince Harry marries Meghan Markle wearing uniform of the Blues & Royals Regiment, made by Dege & Skinner at 10 Savile Row. Page Boys wear miniature replica uniforms, also made at 10 Savile Row.
- 2022 - Swipe Films launches documentary 'Quintessentially British', featuring Managing Director William Skinner.
- 2023 - Makes doeskin tunic for HRH Prince Louis at The Coronation of King Charles III, 6 May 2023
