= 18th-century London =

- 1700–1800
Stuart London	19th-century London
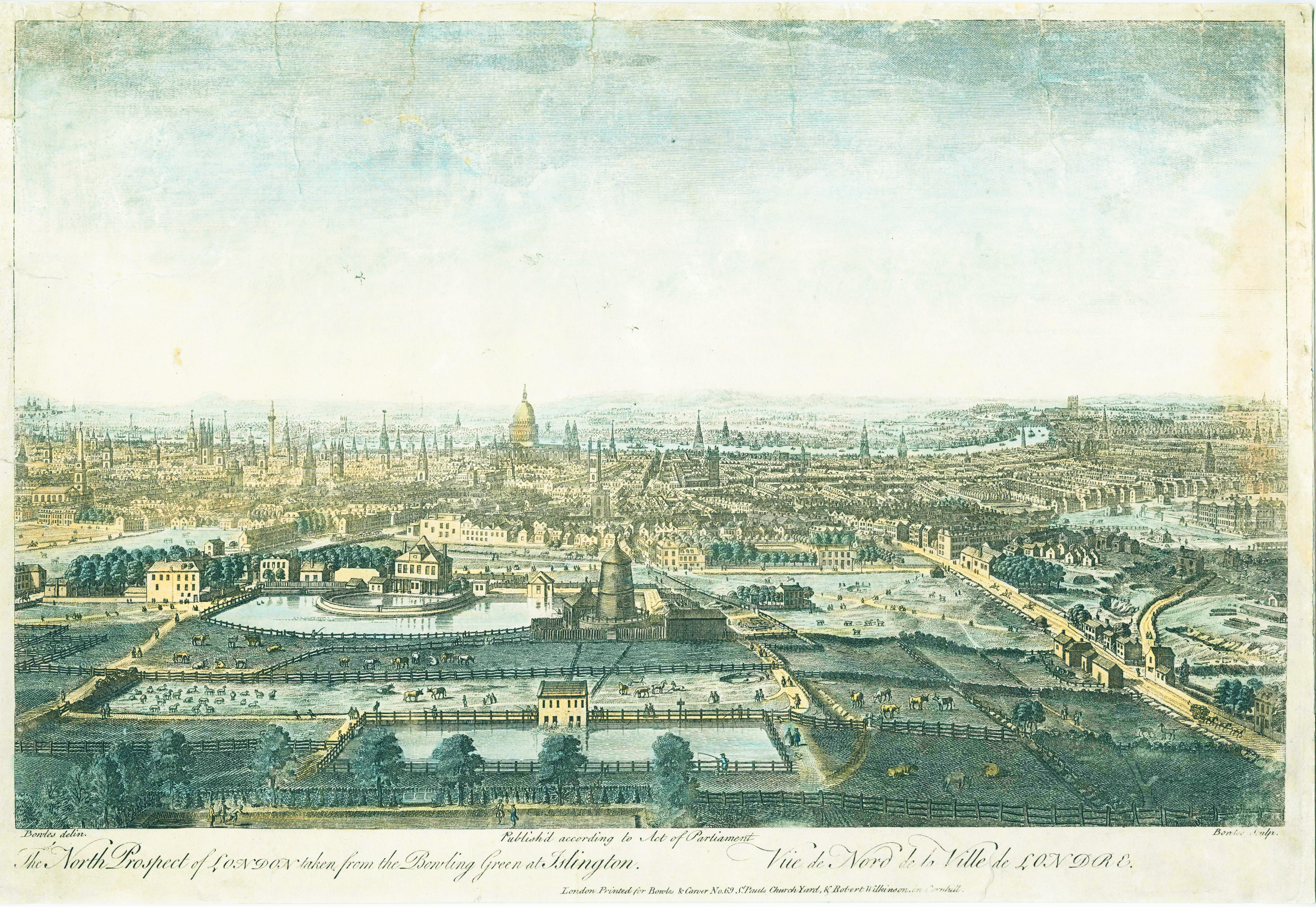
- Mid-18th-century view of London from Islington
- Location: London
- Monarch(s): Anne, Queen of Great Britain, George I of Great Britain, George II of Great Britain, George III

The 18th century was a period of rapid growth for London, reflecting an increasing national population, the early stirrings of the Industrial Revolution, and London's role at the centre of the evolving British Empire. It saw immigrants and visitors from all over the world, particularly Huguenot migrants from France. The built-up area of London increased dramatically in this period, particularly westward as areas such as Mayfair and Marylebone were constructed. Grand aristocratic mansions such as Spencer House were built, as well as churches such as St. Martin-in-the-Fields and Christ Church Spitalfields.

Crime such as armed robbery and sex work were particularly prevalent, leading to the development of early police forces such as the Bow Street Runners and the Thames River Police. Capital and corporal punishment such as hanging, penal transportation and the pillory were used, but the period also saw the development of penitentiary prisons such as that at Coldbath Fields. Londoners saw widespread violence during upheavals such as the Gordon Riots.

Many modern-day cultural institutions come from 18th century London, such as the Royal Society of Arts, the Royal Academy, the British Museum, the Royal Thames Yacht Club, Lord's Cricket Ground, The Times, The Observer, Theatre Royal Haymarket, and the Royal Opera House. London-based artists and writers included Thomas Gainsborough, William Hogarth, Jonathan Swift, Mary Wollstonecraft, and Samuel Johnson.

London's economy was massively boosted by its shipping industry, but other important industries included silkweaving. Many modern-day businesses trace their origins back to 18th-century London, including Sotheby's, WHSmith, and Schweppes. In order to transport goods and people, many new turnpikes and canals were constructed, and educational movements aimed at working-class children, such as Sunday schools, were pioneered in this period.

== Demography ==
At the beginning of the period, about 500,000 people lived in London. By 1713, this number had risen to 630,000; by 1760, it was 740,000, and by the end of the century, it was just over 1 million. The average height of a male Londoner was 5 ft 7 1/4 in (171 cm) and the average height of a female Londoner was 5 ft 1 3/4 in (157 cm).

=== Immigrant and diaspora communities ===
==== African and Afro-Caribbean Londoners ====
In 1768, the abolitionist Granville Sharp estimated that there were 20,000 Black people in domestic service in London. This included some who were enslaved, as evidenced by "for sale" or "runaway" notices in London newspapers. In the aftermath of the American Revolutionary War in the 1780s, there was a small influx of Black Americans who had fought for the British and were therefore no longer welcome in the United States, many of whom become homeless. Some Black Londoners became well known through their writings, such as Ignatius Sancho, Olaudah Equiano, Ottobah Cugoano, Robert Wedderburn, Ukawsaw Gronniosaw, Ayuba Suleiman Diallo, and Phillis Wheatley. Other famous Black Londoners of the day include the violinist George Bridgetower, the fencing master Julius Soubise, and the aristocrats Dido Belle and William Ansah Sessarakoo.

==== Asian Londoners ====
Around the docks in the East End was a population of sailors from India and east Asia known as "lascars" employed on ships belonging to the East India Company. The company ran a boarding house for them called Orchard House in Blackwall. In the wealthier West End of London, Indians were more likely to be employed as domestic servants by officers and former officers of the East India Company. In 1765, the munshi Mirza Sheikh I'tesamuddin became the first-known educated Indian to visit London. He wrote a book in Persian on his experiences in Europe which was later translated into English by James Edward Alexander.

==== European Londoners ====
London had populations of immigrants from various European countries. After the rights of French Protestants called Huguenots were repealed in 1688, thousands fled to London. At the beginning of the period, there were an estimated 25,000 Huguenots in London, particularly in Soho and Spitalfields. At their height, there were 23 French churches in London. Successful Huguenots included the sculptor Louis François Roubiliac and the optician John Dollond. There was also a community of French Catholic immigrants, who ran French-language newspapers such as the Courier Politique et Littéraire and the Courier de Londres. Well-known Londoners from other European countries include the painters Godfrey Kneller, and Johan Zoffany; and the sculptors Peter Scheemakers, Michael Rysbrack and Giuseppe Ceracchi. In 1750, a population of the Bohemian Protestant sect called Moravians settled on Cheyne Walk in Chelsea. They established a Moravian church and burial ground.

An estimated 30,000 Irish immigrants lived in London by the end of the period. Some were particularly successful, including Robert Barker, Hans Sloane, James Barry, Charles Macklin, Jonathan Swift, Laurence Sterne, Oliver Goldsmith, and Richard Brinsley Sheridan.

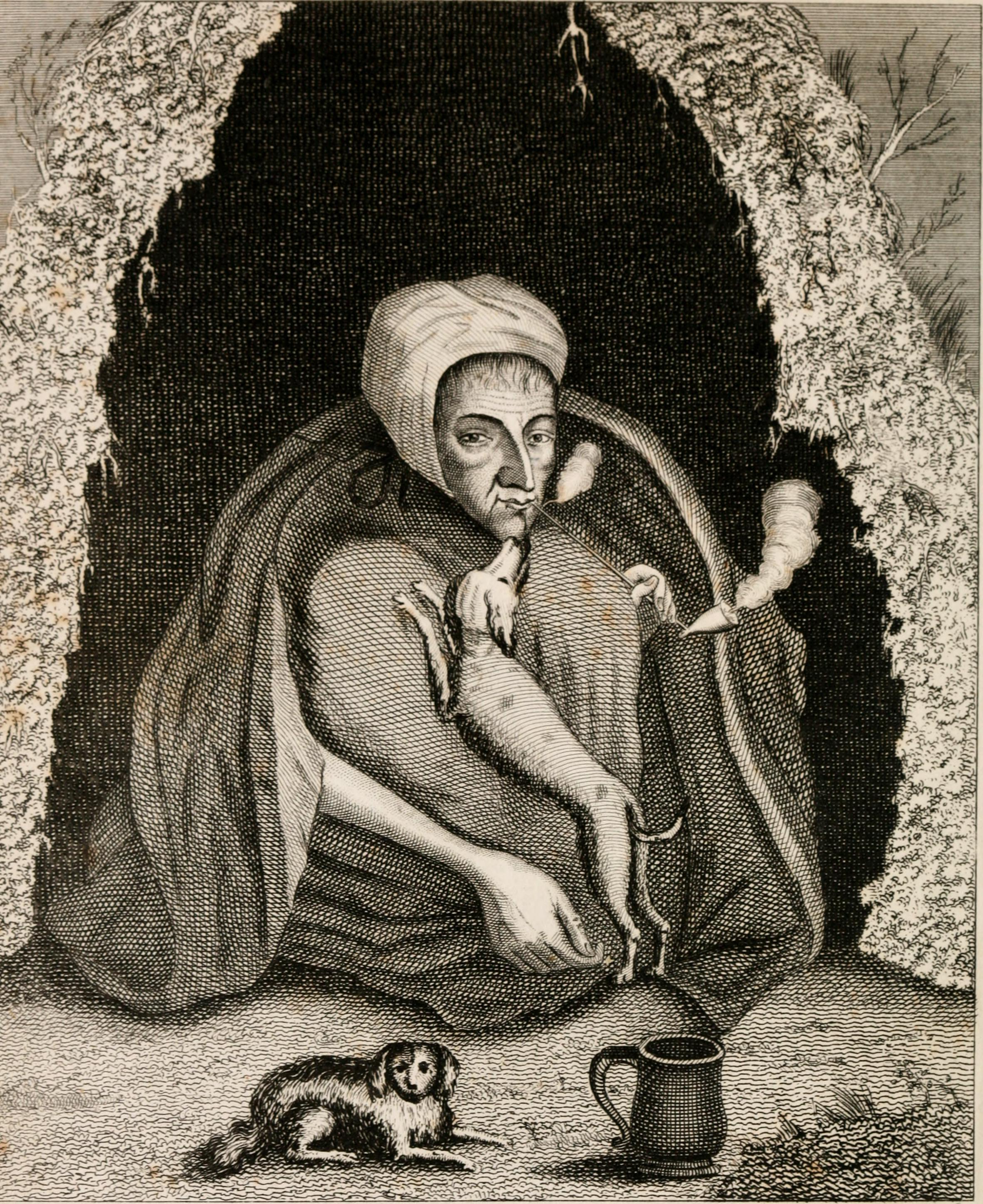
An 1820s portrait of the traveller woman Margaret Finch from Norwood

Theoretically, Romani people and travellers had been expelled from England since the 1560s, but there was nonetheless a community in London in the 18th century, particularly in Norwood. They were particularly associated with horse dealing and fortune-telling at London's fairs. Well-known travellers of the period included Jacob Rewbrey of Westminster, Margaret Finch of Norwood, and Diana Boswell from Dulwich.

Historian Jerry White estimates that there were about 750 Jewish people living in London at the beginning of the period. By the end of the century, that number had risen to about 15,000. In 1701, Bevis Marks synagogue opened to cater to Sephardic Jews descended from Spanish and Portuguese immigrants. It is still a working synagogue to this day. Ashkenazi Jews, descended from Dutch, German and central European immigrants, used the Great Synagogue in Duke's Place, the Hambro' Synagogue off Fenchurch Street, and the New Synagogue on Leadenhall Street. Practising Jews could not join the city's trade guilds, and so many Jewish business owners lived outside the city, in places like Aldgate and Whitechapel. Michael Leoni was a famous Jewish singer, and Daniel Mendoza a famous Jewish boxer.

There were smaller numbers of people who came from further afield, such as Mehemet von Königstreu and Ernst August Mustapha, Turkish valets to George I.

=== Other visitors ===
London also drew in people from all over the globe, even if they only visited for a short time. Examples include the Native American chief Tomochichi and his retinue, who met George II in 1734; the Raiatean man Mai, who visited in 1774 and had his portrait painted by the artist Joshua Reynolds; and the Aboriginal Australians Bennelong and Yemmerrawanne, who visited in 1793.

== Topography ==
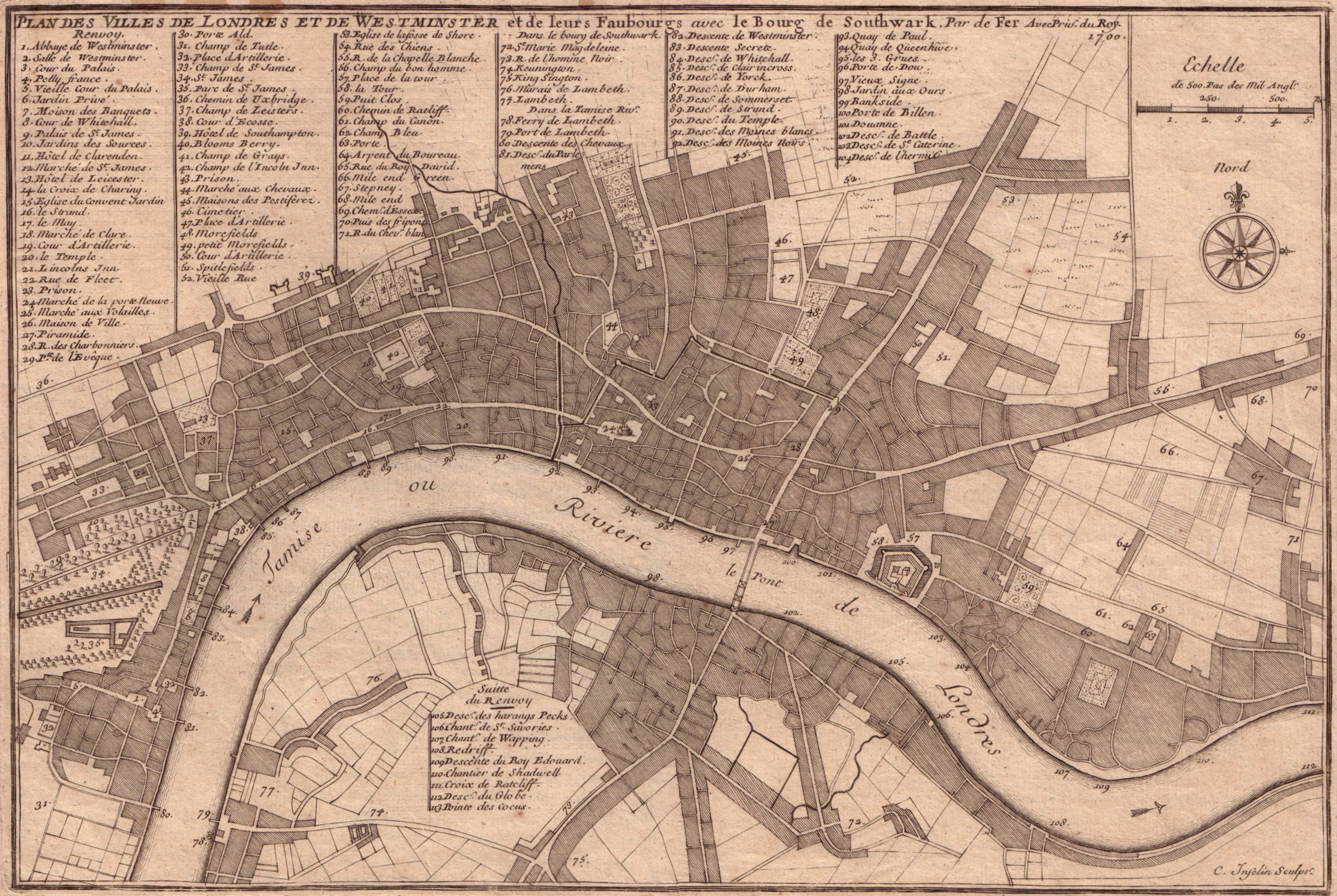
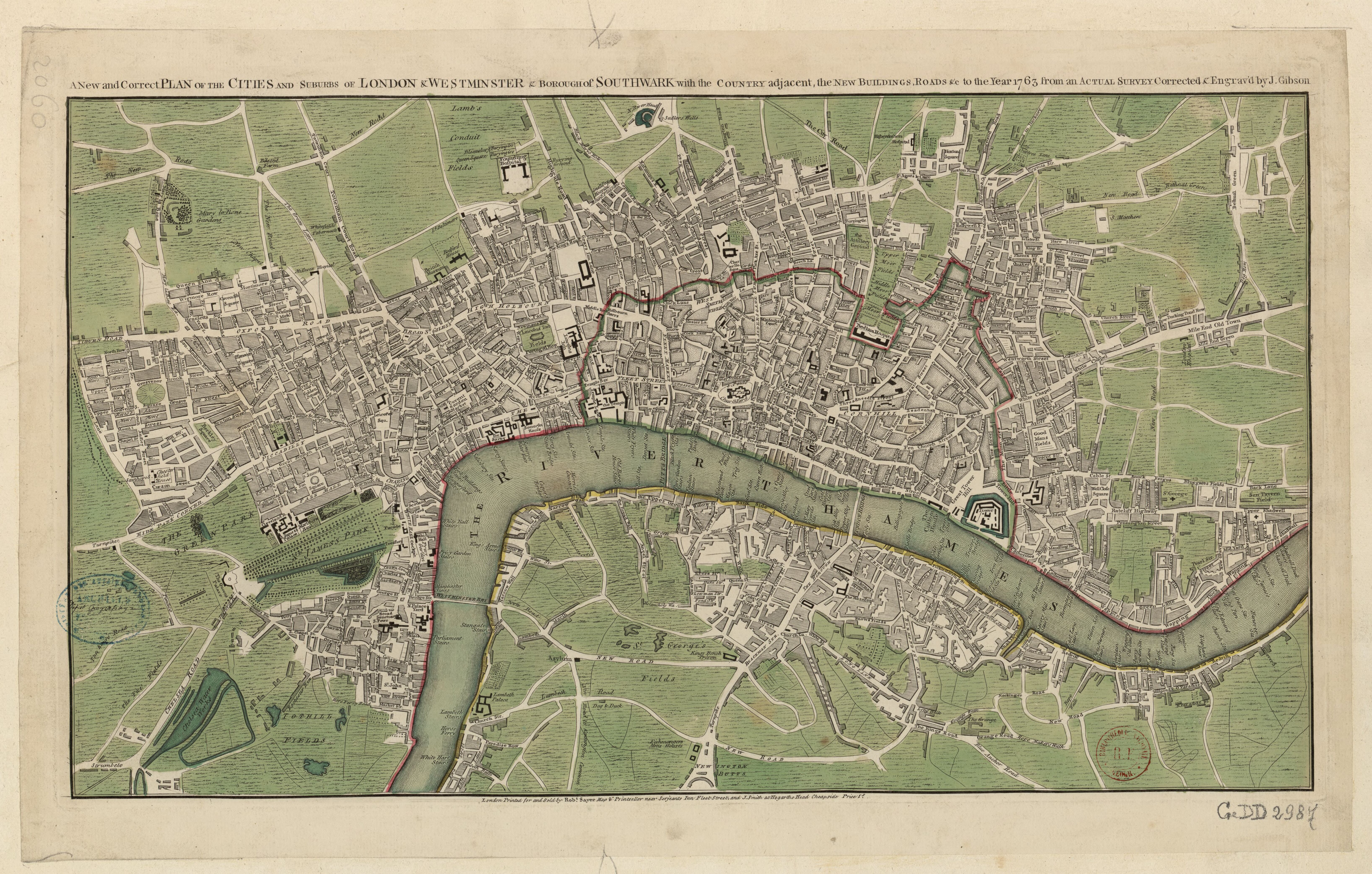
A map of London made in 1700 (in black and white) compared to a map made in 1763 (in colour). London has spread much further west in the second map, as far as Park Lane (marked as Tyburn Lane).

=== Extent ===
London's growth in the 18th century was marked above all by the westward shift of the population away from the City of London. Westminster was intensively developed, with new districts like Mayfair housing Britain's wealthiest aristocratic families. Cavendish Square and Hanover Square were both laid out in the 1710s, while the Portman Estate, which occupies the western half of Marylebone, began its own building program in the 1750s with the granting of commercial leases, followed by the commencement of building on Portman Square in 1764. Manchester Square was begun in 1776. Comparison of London maps made in the mid-17th century with ones made in the mid-18th century also reveal that the new developments were much more likely to be built along grid structures.

The most exclusive area, Mayfair, was intensively built up with luxury townhouses on an area occupied by seven different estates: the Grosvenor, Burlington, Berkeley, Curzon, Milfield, Conduit Mead, and Albemarle Ground estates. The Grosvenor estate, in the northwest corner between Oxford Street and Park Lane, was the most substantial private plot of land, featuring an orderly grid network of streets constructed around Grosvenor Square in the early 1720s. By 1738 "nearly the whole space between Piccadilly and Oxford Street was covered with buildings as far as Tyburn Lane [Park Lane], except in the south-western corner about Berkeley Square and Mayfair". Further west, the Cadogan Estate began working on the area between Knightsbridge and Sloane Square in 1777.

To the south, the area now known as Elephant & Castle was also laid out in this period, with a road from Westminster Bridge connecting up to Borough High Street, and the New Kent Road also constructed. To the north, new developments sprang up around between Paddington and Islington such as Pentonville, named after its landlord, Henry Penton; and Somers Town, named after its landlord, Charles Cocks, 1st Baron Somers. Construction began on Bedford Square in 1775, which has been called "the most perfect of the London squares of the period", and Finsbury Square was begun in 1777. Building started on Camden Town in 1791, named after the 1st Earl Camden.

Rural villages surrounding Westminster and the city also grew in population and were gradually incorporated into the metropolis: areas like Bethnal Green and Shadwell to the east, or Paddington and St. Pancras to the northwest. In 1750 the London topographer John Noorthouck reckoned that London proper consisted of 46 former villages, two cities (Westminster and the City of London proper), and one borough (Southwark). Westminster had a population of 162,077, the City 116,755, and Southwark 61,169.

=== New buildings ===
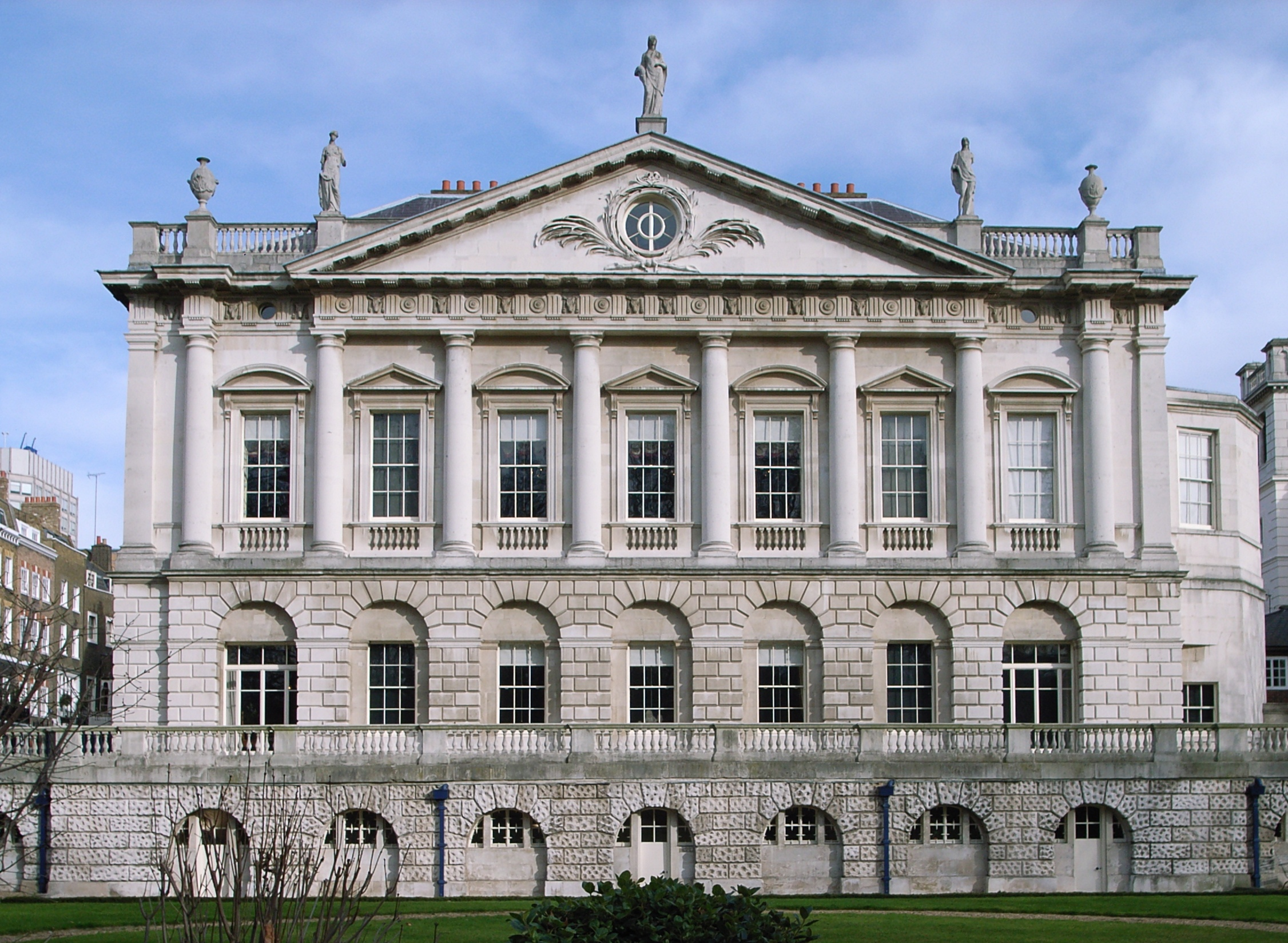
Spencer House, built in the 1750s and 1760s for John Spencer, 1st Earl Spencer

New mansions built in this period include Burgh House in Hampstead (1703), Buckingham House (1705), Marlborough House (begun 1709), Marble Hill and Chiswick House (1729), Strawberry Hill (begun 1747), Spencer House (competed 1766), Albany (1770), Home House (completed 1776), Apsley House (completed 1778), and Dover House (completed 1787). Buckingham House, later known as Buckingham Palace, was bought by George III in 1762. In 1783, work began on expanding and renovating Carlton House for the then Prince of Wales, which took years to be completed as well as huge amounts of taxpayer money, only for the Prince to live there for a very short amount of time.

In 1732, part of no. 10 Downing Street was acquired by the Crown and offered to the Prime Minister Robert Walpole. As he already had many houses and didn't want to pay to upkeep another, he accepted it as a perk of his position, beginning the tradition of passing the house down to each successive Prime Minister. It was substantially remodelled by the architect William Kent. The residence of the Lord Mayor of the City of London, Mansion House, was completed in 1753 after having been designed by architect George Dance the Elder. The current Treasury building was completed in 1736.

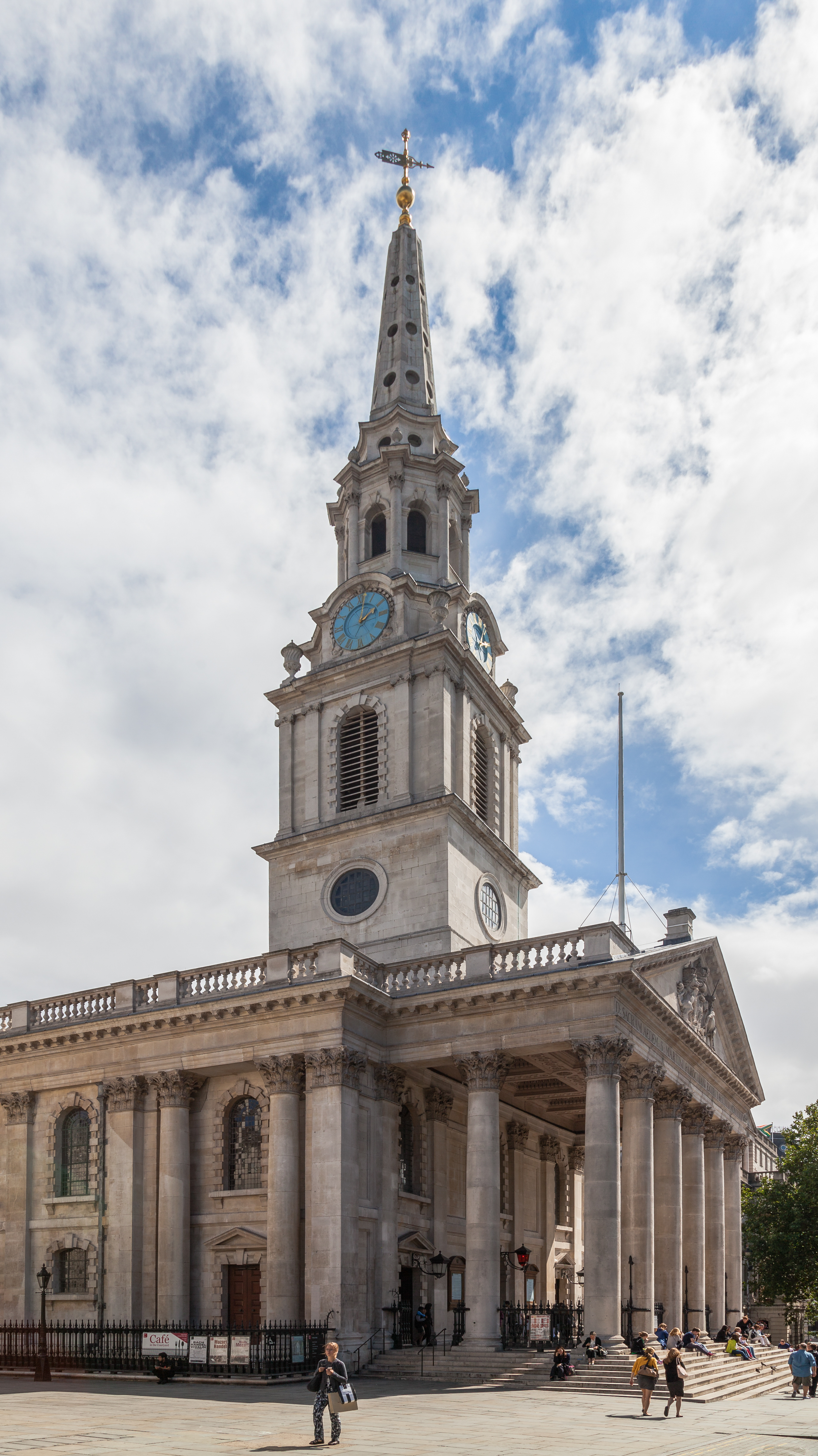
The church of St. Martin-in-the-Fields, designed by James Gibbs and built in the 1720s

Bevis Marks Synagogue was one of the first new religious buildings of the period, opening in 1701. In 1710, the final stone was added to St. Paul's Cathedral, designed by Christopher Wren. This cathedral replaced Old St. Paul's, which had been completely destroyed in the Great Fire of London. A flurry of church-building between 1711 and 1730 also saw the construction of Christ Church Spitalfields, St. Anne's Limehouse, St. George in the East, St. George's Bloomsbury, St. Mary Woolnoth, St. Mary-le-Strand, St. Paul's Deptford, St. Giles-in-the-Fields, St. George's Hanover Square, St. Anne's Kew, St. Botolph-without-Bishopsgate, St. Mary's Rotherhithe, St. Peter's Vere Street, St. Martin-in-the-Fields, St. John's Smith Square, and Grosvenor Chapel. After this, further churches built in the period include St. George the Martyr, Southwark (1736), St. Mary's Ealing (1740), St. John-at-Hampstead (1747), Wesley's Chapel (1756), and the Portland Chapel (1766). Another burst of church-building occurred towards the end of the period, with new churches such as St. Mary's Paddington, St. James's Clerkenwell, and St. Patrick's Soho Square (1792), St. John-at-Hackney and St. Martin Outwich (1798).

The period also saw the construction of several bridges across the Thames alongside London Bridge. With the completion of Westminster Bridge in 1750, London gained a much needed second crossing onto the south bank, and Blackfriars Bridge opened in 1769. To the west, Putney Bridge was built in 1729, Kew built its first bridge in 1759, and Richmond Bridge opened in 1777.

The first Freemasons' Hall was built on Great Queen Street in 1776. Severndroog Castle was built in 1784 to commemorate the seagoing victories of Sir William James, who had died the previous year. Trinity House was built for the body that governs English and Welsh lighthouses in 1795. Shop fronts also began to be built with large windows for passers-by to see the goods inside, examples of which can still be seen at 88 Dean Street and James Lock & Co on St. James's Street. New government offices included Somerset House, the Admiralty, and Horse Guards.

=== Urban fabric ===
To accommodate the rapid growth of population, Parliament enacted building legislation and initiated important infrastructure projects. The Fleet River, which was so filled with rubbish and sewage that it had been a health hazard for many years, was finally covered over in 1733. The New Road running between Paddington and Islington was constructed beginning in 1756. Intended as a drover's road upon which livestock could be driven to Smithfield Market without encountering the congested road network of the city further south, the 60 ft (18 m) wide New Road was London's first bypass and served as the informal northern boundary for London for years to come. The City Road was added in 1761, connecting the Angel to Finsbury Square. To improve traffic, the houses on London Bridge were removed in 1757, the Holbein Gate in Whitehall was removed in 1759, and the gates of the city were removed 1760–1777.

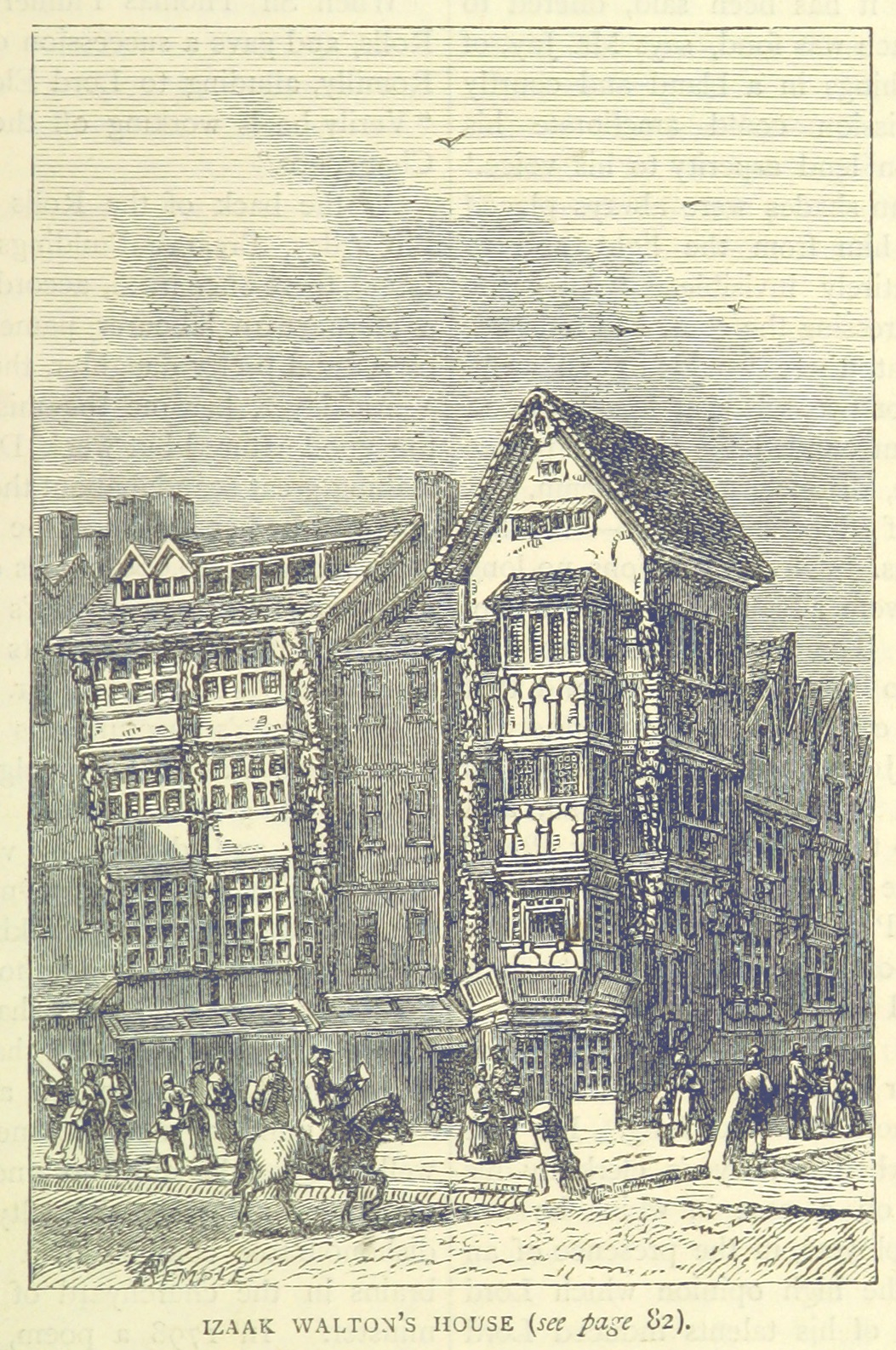
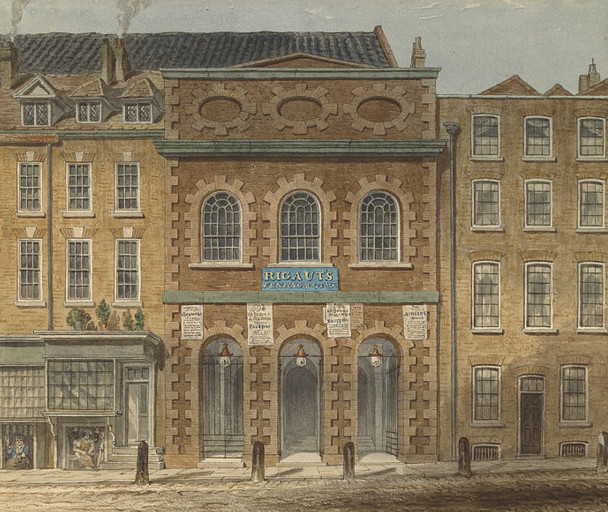
A London building from the 17th century (in black and white) compared to one built in the 18th century (in colour). Notice how the later building has no overhanging storeys or signs, and the window frames are recessed slightly.

From 1707, buildings in London were no longer permitted with upper storeys overhanging the lower ones, so facades on future buildings were strictly vertical. After the Building Regulation Act 1709 (7 Ann. c. 17), wooden window frames were required to be recessed at least 4 inches into the wall to prevent the spread of fire up a building's facade. In 1762, shop signs that hung down were banned in the City and Westminster, and had to be fixed flat to the building instead to prevent them blocking out sunlight and falling on people walking underneath. The Building Act 1777 set building requirements for new housing and sought to eliminate rampant jerry-building and shoddy construction work. Housing was divided into four "rates" based on ground rents, with each of the rates accorded their own strict building codes. The Building Act accounts for the remarkable uniformity of Georgian terraced housing and squares in London built in subsequent decades, which critics like John Summerson criticized for their "inexpressible monotony".

Landmark legislation included the Westminster Paving Act 1765 (5 Geo. 3. c. 50), which required streets be equipped with pavements, drainage, and lighting. The success of the legislation inspired the London Paving and Lighting Act 1766 (6 Geo. 3. c. 26), which extended the same provisions across the whole city and required that houses be numbered and streets and pavements be cleansed and swept regularly. Street lighting was more extensive than in any other city in Europe, something which amazed foreign visitors to the capital in the late 18th century. The practice of numbering houses also dates from this period, with some sources claiming it started in New Burlington Street. The practice of putting street names on signs at each corner was taken up by the city from 1765 onwards.

== Crime and law enforcement ==
Armed robbery was particularly common in London, either by highwaymen (on horseback) or footpads (on foot). One gang, run by a man called Obadiah Lemon, used fishing hooks to steal hats and wigs through open coach windows, or leapt on top and cut through the roof. George III himself was robbed of his shoe buckles and spare change while walking in Kensington Gardens. During the 1750s, several outyling towns in London's suburbs organised their own guard patrols to combat robbers on their roads. For example, Blackheath residents offered rewards for information on highwaymen in 1753, and Kentish Town inhabitants paid to hire guards in 1756.

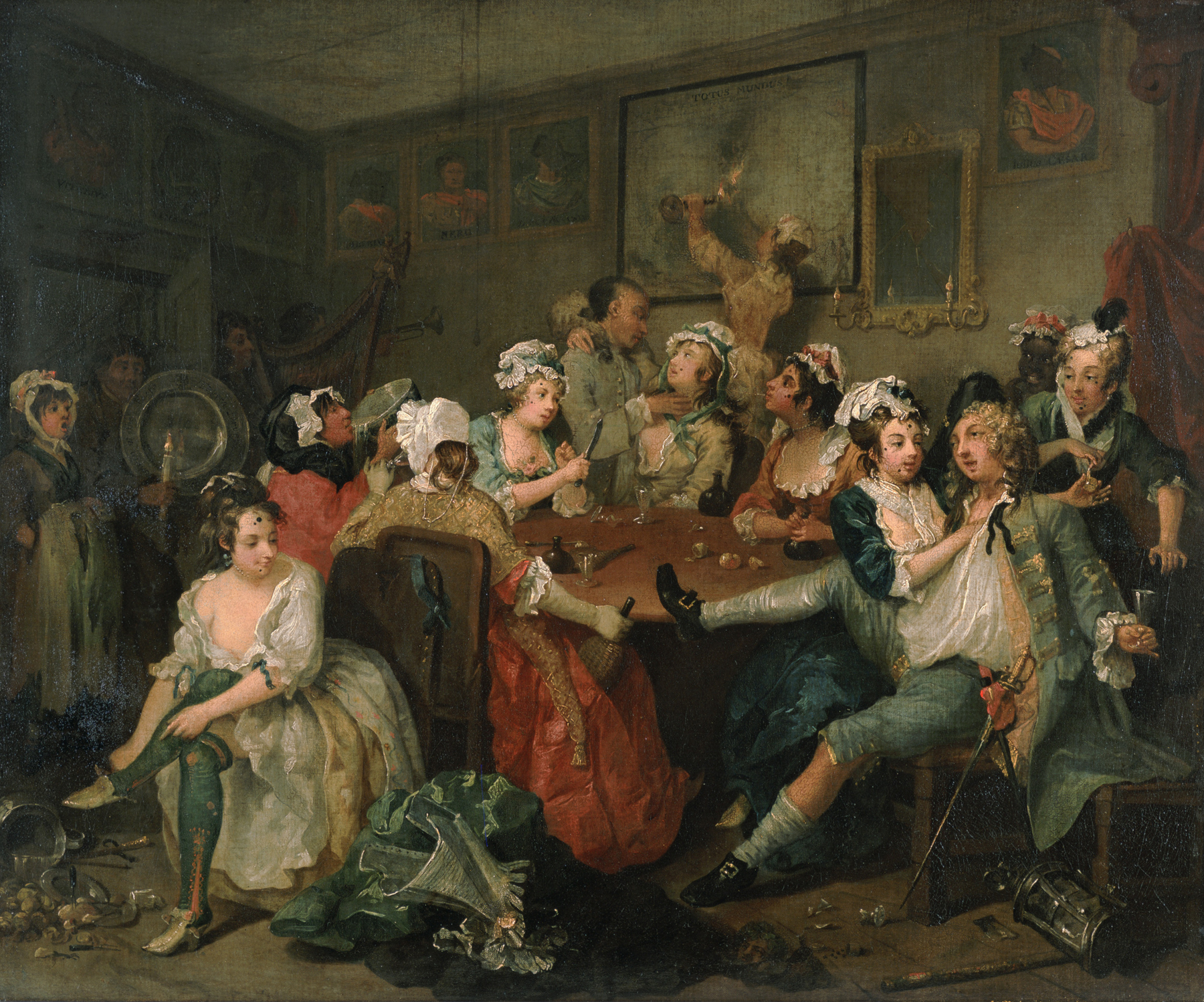
A Rake's Progress, plate 3, by William Hogarth, 1735, depicting a brothel full of sex workers

Pickpocketing was also particularly common in London, where large crowds often gathered at executions and theatre performances. There was also large amounts of theft on the river, as ships laden with valuable goods waited with skeleton crews for a berth in the Pool of London. £70,000 worth of sugar alone was stolen per year from boats on the river. Sex work was another common crime, particularly associated with Covent Garden. In 1758, it was estimated that 3,000 sex workers lived in London. On one routine sweep, constables arrested 22 sex workers in Covent Garden, two of whom were men dressed as women. In 1757, a catalogue of London's sex workers was published called Harris's List of Covent Garden Ladies, which detailed the names, locations, and descriptions of hundreds of workers in the capital.

Although the crime of buggery was punishable by death, London had several establishments known as "molly houses", where queer men could meet. According to one homophobic pamphlet of the time, men in molly houses took on female personas and performed mock weddings and birth ceremonies. The 18th century saw a huge backlash against molly houses, with the publication of pamphlets such as The Sodomites' Shame and Doom, and groups such as the Society for the Reformation of Manners attempting to track down queer men and have them prosecuted. One of the most famous molly houses was Mother Clap's in Holborn, which was raided in 1726, resulting in 40 arrests and three hangings. Mother Clap herself was sentenced to the pillory and two years in prison.

=== Law enforcement ===
There was no organised police force in this period. In times of serious emergency, or in the case of organised gangs, the authorities could deploy the military, but this was deeply unpopular, both with citizens and with the military themselves. There were small, specialised forces, such as the King's Messengers (who dealt with sedition, particularly Jacobites), the Press Messengers (who dealt with seditious publishers) and the City Marshals (localised to the City of London). Local magistrates, or Justices of the Peace, could issue warrants for criminals; and their officers, constables, would apprehend them. Constables were also responsible for policing low-level criminals such as sex workers and fortune tellers, detecting crime, and raising the "hue and cry". Below them, beadles were responsible for making sure that those who qualified for "outdoor relief" were receiving it, acting as town crier, and supervising the town watch; and the watch patrolled the streets at night armed with a lantern and a cudgel to discourage crime. Corruption was endemic, meaning that if one wanted someone prosecuted, one had to do all the leg-work oneself, bribing officers at every stage. In previous eras, Londoners had been able to claim sanctuary at monasteries and former monasteries in order to avoid the law, but by 1712 this practice had been eradicated.

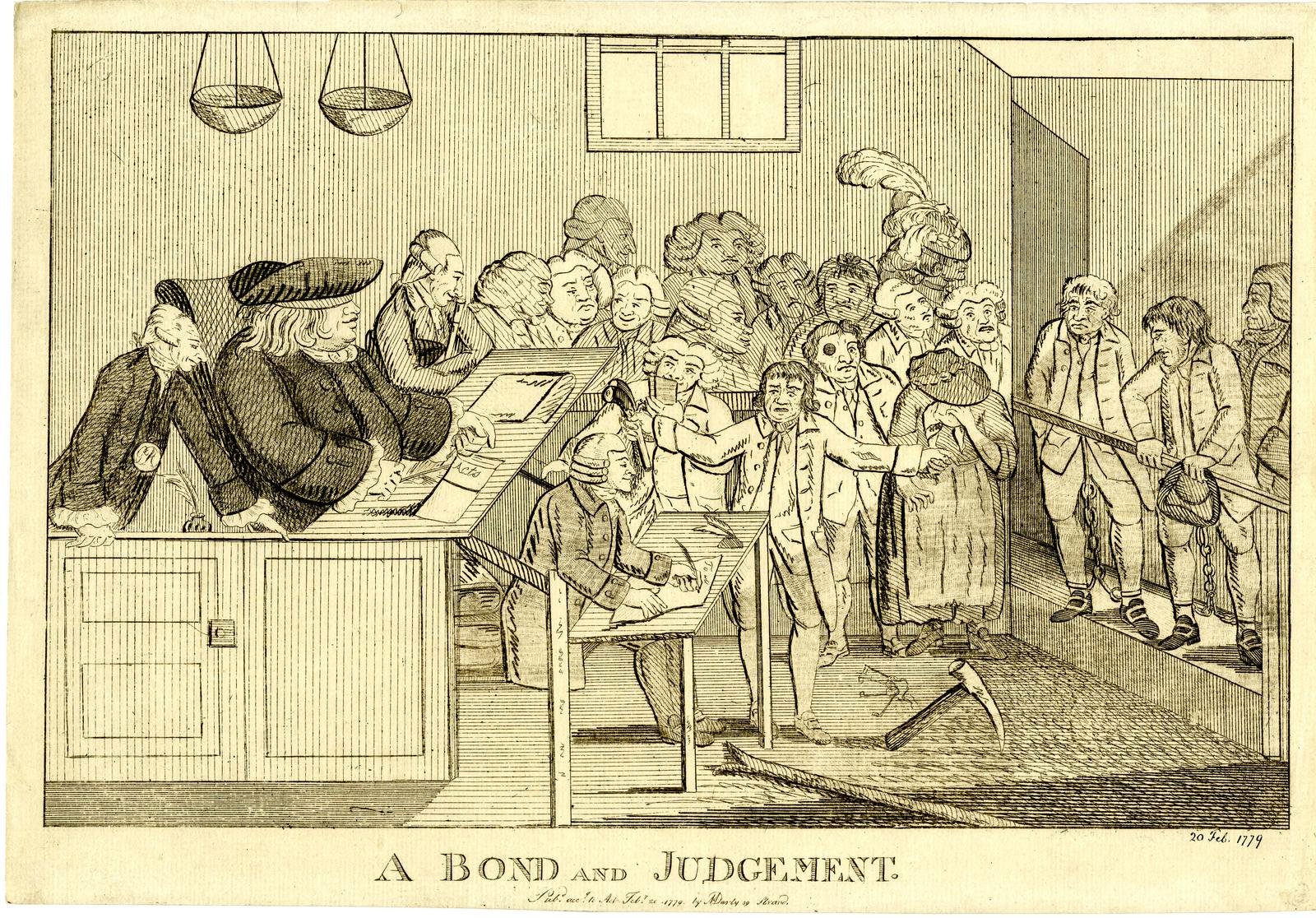
A satirical cartoon of John Fielding examining evidence at Bow Street Magistrates' Court, 1779

Bow Street Magistrates' Court opened in 1740 in Covent Garden. One of the magistrates, Henry Fielding, established the Bow Street Runners in 1749 as an early form of a police force. They took the form of six parish constables who acted as bounty hunters, being paid a regular salary plus bonuses for any criminal they apprehended who was successfully prosecuted. The Bow Street Runners were unusual in that they are generally agreed to have not been corrupt. In 1754, John Fielding took over as chief magistrate, and his writings on the model popularised the concept across the country as he advocated for a national police force. Fielding is even credited with popularising the word "police". By the end of the century, there were eight or nine other such groups belonging to magistrates' courts around London.

Inspired by the Bow Street Runners, in 1798 Patrick Colquhoun set up the River Police, sometimes called the first professional police force in the country, which tackled crime in the docks and Pool of London.

=== Punishments ===
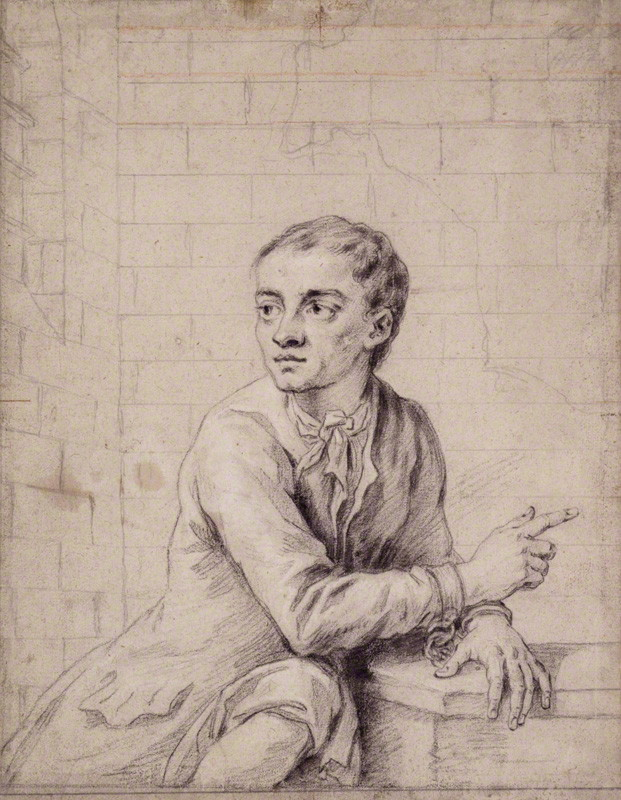
A sketch of the famous thief and prison escapee, Jack Sheppard, possibly made by James Thornhill in 1724, shortly before Sheppard's execution

Throughout the period, the number of crimes, especially property crimes, subject to the death penalty ballooned under a period of English law known as the Bloody Code. Of those executions, London played host to the vast majority. Hanging was a common punishment for several crimes. In the period 1750–1775, 3.85 people per 100,000 were hanged per year on average, and only 12% of these were for murder, as the number of people executed for property crimes grew under the Bloody Code. Hangings were public, and could attract large crowds depending on the fame of the victims. When the thief Jack Sheppard, who had escaped from prison multiple times, was finally hanged at Tyburn in 200,000 people reportedly came to see it. In the 1780s, the authorities stopped use of Tyburn as London's main execution site in favour of Newgate Prison. The last person executed at Tyburn was a man called John Austin in 1782. London employed a chief hangman and an assistant for this job, at a salary of £50 per year plus a guinea per execution. The most famous of these was John Price, who was himself hanged for murder in 1718. As an extra punishment for particularly cold-blooded crimes, a hanged body would be publicly displayed in chains, such as a Mrs Phipoe in 1797, whose body was displayed at the Old Bailey.

Pirates were generally hanged at Execution Dock on the foreshore of the Thames near Brewhouse Lane and Wapping High Street, and the bodies would be left there until they had been covered by three tides of the river. This was done to Captain William Kidd in 1701. Burning at the stake was used as a punishment for women who committed treason, as in the case of Katherine Hayes, who was burned in 1726 at Tyburn for murdering her husband. As the period went on, this sentence changed to include being hanged before the body was burned at the stake. Men who committed treason were sentenced to be hanged, drawn and quartered, as was the case for several soldiers who supported the 1745 Jacobite Rebellion, who were executed on Kennington Common. Nobles who committed treason were permitted to die by beheading. The last person to be executed by beheading in Britain was Lord Lovat on Tower Hill in 1747. Prisoners who refused to plead either guilty or not guilty would be "pressed" to death, otherwise known as peine forte et dure, by being slowly crushed by large stones, a practice abolished in 1772.

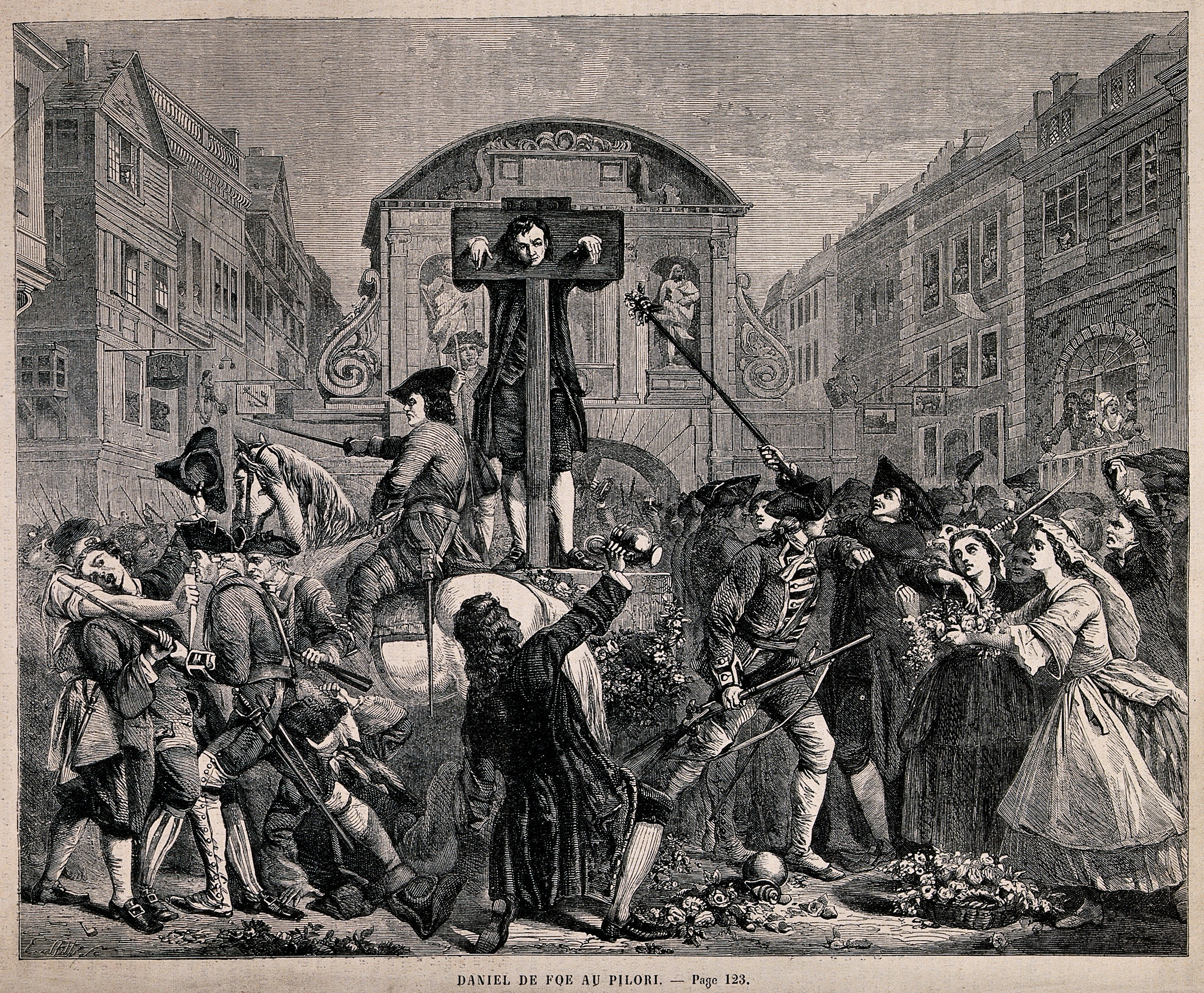
An engraving of the writer Daniel Defoe being pilloried for seditious libel in 1703. He was so popular that instead of stoning him, the crowd threw flowers, which can be seen on the ground.

After the Transportation Act 1717, transportation became another common punishment. At the beginning of the period, convicts were transported to the American colonies, where their labour would be sold to a plantation for the duration of their sentence, but after the American Revolutionary War, the authorities looked for a new location. London's first shipment of convicts to Australia set off in 1787, and landed in Port Jackson, in modern-day Sydney. Some crimes were punished by whipping, which could take place either in public, tied to the back of a cart and being marched through the streets; or in the private confines of a prison. Another punishment designed to inflict public humiliation was the pillory. As the century went on, those sentenced to the pillory would increasingly find themselves at the mercy of the mob, who could either protect them while they served their sentence or throw rotten vegetables, manure, dead animals, or rocks. Several people were killed by mobs while in the pillory.

=== Prisons ===
At the beginning of the period, there were three kinds of prison in London: gaols such as that on Horsemonger Lane, where arrestees were kept prior to a trial; debtors' prisons such as Marshalsea; and houses of correction such as Bridewell Prison for the "reformation" of those who had no employment- often sex workers and the homeless. In 1779, a new kind of prison was introduced called the pentitentiary, with an emphasis on forcing criminals to do hard labour. In 1794, London gained a new prison at Coldbath Fields, where prisoners worked at occupations such as oakum-picking or walking on a treadmill, in silence, for ten hours a day

London's prisons were often filthy and its officers corrupt. In 1726, an investigation into conditions in the Fleet Prison revealed that families had to bribe the warden to hand over the bodies of their family members who had died inside; and that one man called Jacob Solas had been chained up next to a sewer and a rubbish heap for two months. In 1750, an outbreak of "jail fever" at the Old Bailey next to Newgate Prison killed at least 50 people.

== War and uprisings ==
In 1715, claimant to the throne James Stuart landed in Scotland in what is known as the Jacobite Rebellion. In London, his supporters rioted, burning a portrait of William III, drinking toasts to James II, and attacking those who refused to join them. Soldiers were mobilised in Hyde Park in the event that Stuart should reach the capital. In 1745, Stuart made another attempt, leading to a military camp being set up at Finchley in case the Jacobite forces reached London from Scotland. In the end, they only made it as far as Derby.

In 1763, the politician John Wilkes came under scrutiny after he wrote articles criticising George III. He was briefly imprisoned in the Tower of London, and his newspaper, the North Briton, was burned in a ritual execution outside the Royal Exchange. During the burning, Londoners rushed to rescue copies from the flames, and attacked the sheriff in his coach. Later that year, the MP Samuel Martin challenged Wilkes to a duel in Hyde Park, during which he shot Wilkes in the stomach. When Wilkes won an election in 1768, his supporters marched through the streets from Brentford to London, and when they got there, they broke all the windows in the newly built Mansion House. On 10 May, a soldiers fired upon a group of Wilkes' supporters at St. George's Fields, and several people were killed. The following year, Wilkes won a re-election, but the government nonetheless announced his opponent as the winner. When supporters of the government marched to St. James's, they were pelted with mud by Wilkes' supporters. Wilkes was so popular among Londoners that in 1774 there was a crush to be one of the people who got to pull his coach, and one man was killed.

During the American Revolutionary War, the City of London generally favoured the colonists, arguing that their taxation was too heavy and that the government should not use violence against them. In 1775, the City sent a petition to the king with 1,171 signatures to this effect.

In 1780, London was rocked by the Gordon Riots, an uprising led by Lord George Gordon against Roman Catholic emancipation. Severe damage was caused to Catholic churches and homes, and rioters also attacked legal buildings such as the Bow Street magistrates' court, Newgate Prison, the King's Bench Prison, the Fleet Prison, and The Clink. Houses of Protestants who were sympathetic to Catholics, such as those of George Savile, Lord Justice Cox, and the Earl of Mansfield, were also destroyed. One newspaper at the time estimated that over 450 people were killed in the riots themselves, and 35 were executed in the aftermath, although George Gordon himself escaped the gallows.

== Culture ==
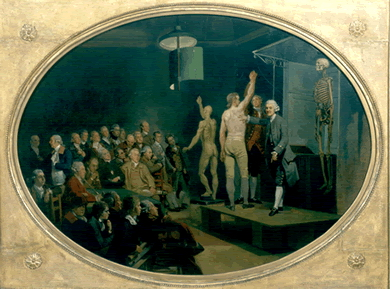
An anatomy class given for members of the Royal Academy by Dr William Hunter, painted by Johan Zoffany

The Royal Society of Arts was founded in 1754 in Crane Court. In 1774, they moved into their current address on John Adam Street. The Royal Academy was established in 1768 at Somerset House as an art school that ran a regular exhibition of artworks by its members. Its first president was the painter Joshua Reynolds, and its pupils included J. M. W. Turner and John Constable. Popular London portrait artists included Arthur Devis, John Wootton, Allan Ramsay, Johann Zoffany, Thomas Gainsborough, and Joshua Reynolds. William Hogarth created satirical paintings such as A Rake's Progress that became famous as engraved prints. James Barry created early Romantic paintings.

The British Museum opened in Montagu House in 1759, displaying the collection of Hans Sloane's books, coins, medals and natural history specimens; the Harleian collection of manuscripts assembled by the 1st and 2nd earls of Oxford; and the Cotton collection of manuscripts that included Magna Carta and the Lindisfarne Gospels. Only eight visitors saw it on its first day of operation.

The Mozart family arrived in London in 1764, staying at Cecil Court, Ebury Street and Frith Street, and performing in several concerts. During this time, Wolfgang Amadeus Mozart wrote several works including his first symphony, Symphony No. 1, at the age of eight. The pianoforte also appeared in London for the first time in this period, with a concert including the instrument being performed in 1767 at the Covent Garden Theatre, now known as the Royal Opera House.

Many of St. James's gentlemen's clubs date from this period, including Almack's, Brooks's, and Boodle's. These clubs offered society and gambling to wealthy gentlemen, and many are still in operation today. Outside St. James's, other important gentlemen's clubs were founded such as the Kit-Cat Club, which met around the Strand and included famous Whigs of the day.

=== Sport ===
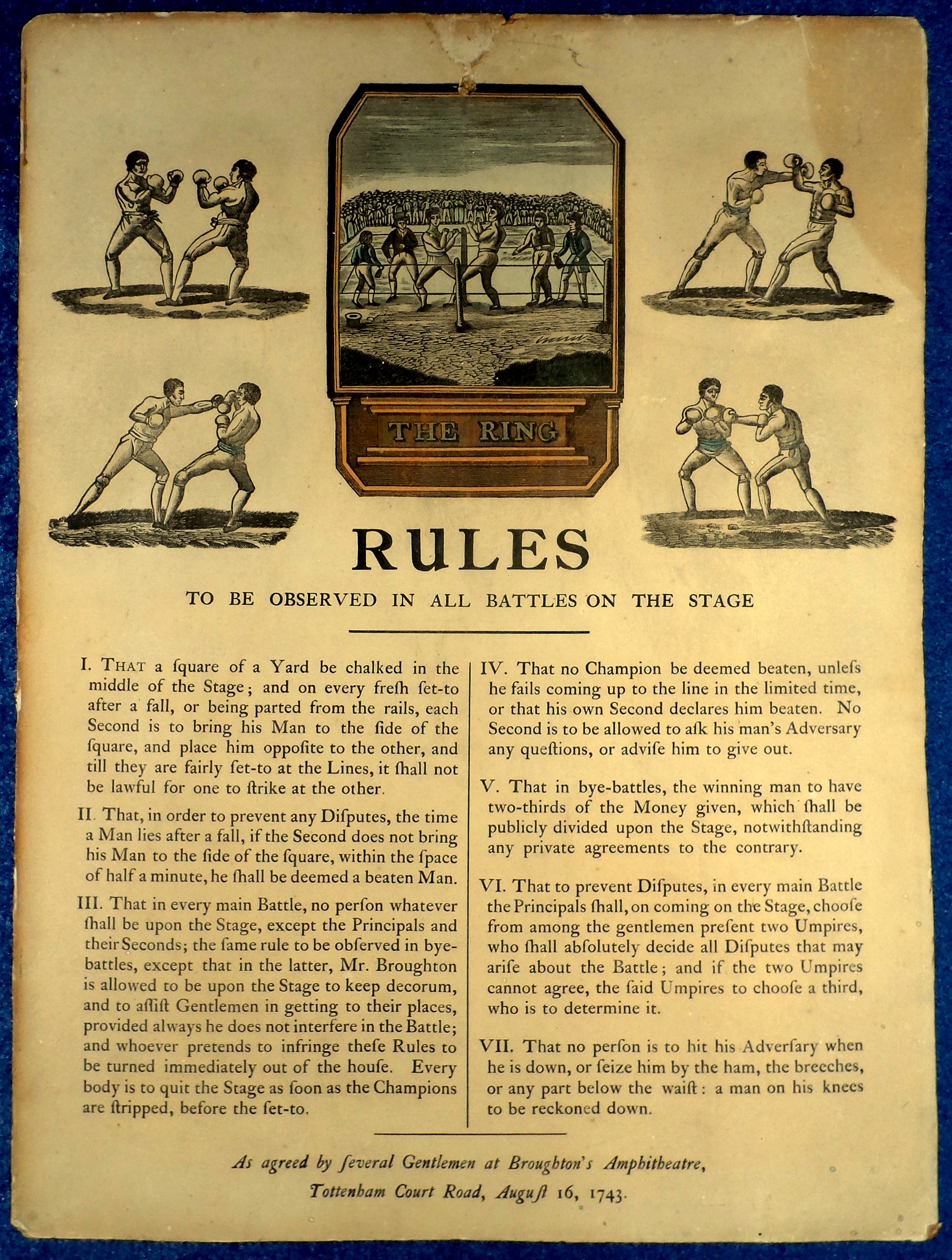
Jack Broughton's boxing rules, published in 1743

Bare-knuckle boxing, also known as prizefighting, was incredibly popular, despite being illegal. Famous boxers included James Figg, Jack Broughton, Tom Johnson, and Daniel Mendoza. Broughton introduced an early form of boxing gloves called "mufflers" and laid down a set of rules for his boxing arena on Tottenham Court Road in order to ensure the safety of participants. These rules have been called the "first written rules to be applied to any sport".

In 1749, London held Britain's first-known open yacht race, from Greenwich to the mouth of the Thames. In 1775, the Cumberland Fleet became the first yacht club to organise races. In the 1750s, the Jockey Club was formed by aristocratic regulars at the Star and Garter Club in Pall Mall.

The first attempt at codifying the rules of cricket was made by the London Cricket Club at the Artillery Ground in Finsbury in 1744. Lord's cricket ground was founded in this period, with the wine merchant Thomas Lord leasing out a parcel of land in Islington for his friends to play cricket on in 1787. The Marylebone Cricket Club grew out of players at this venue, with the club's earliest minute books also dating back to this year.

=== Entertainment ===
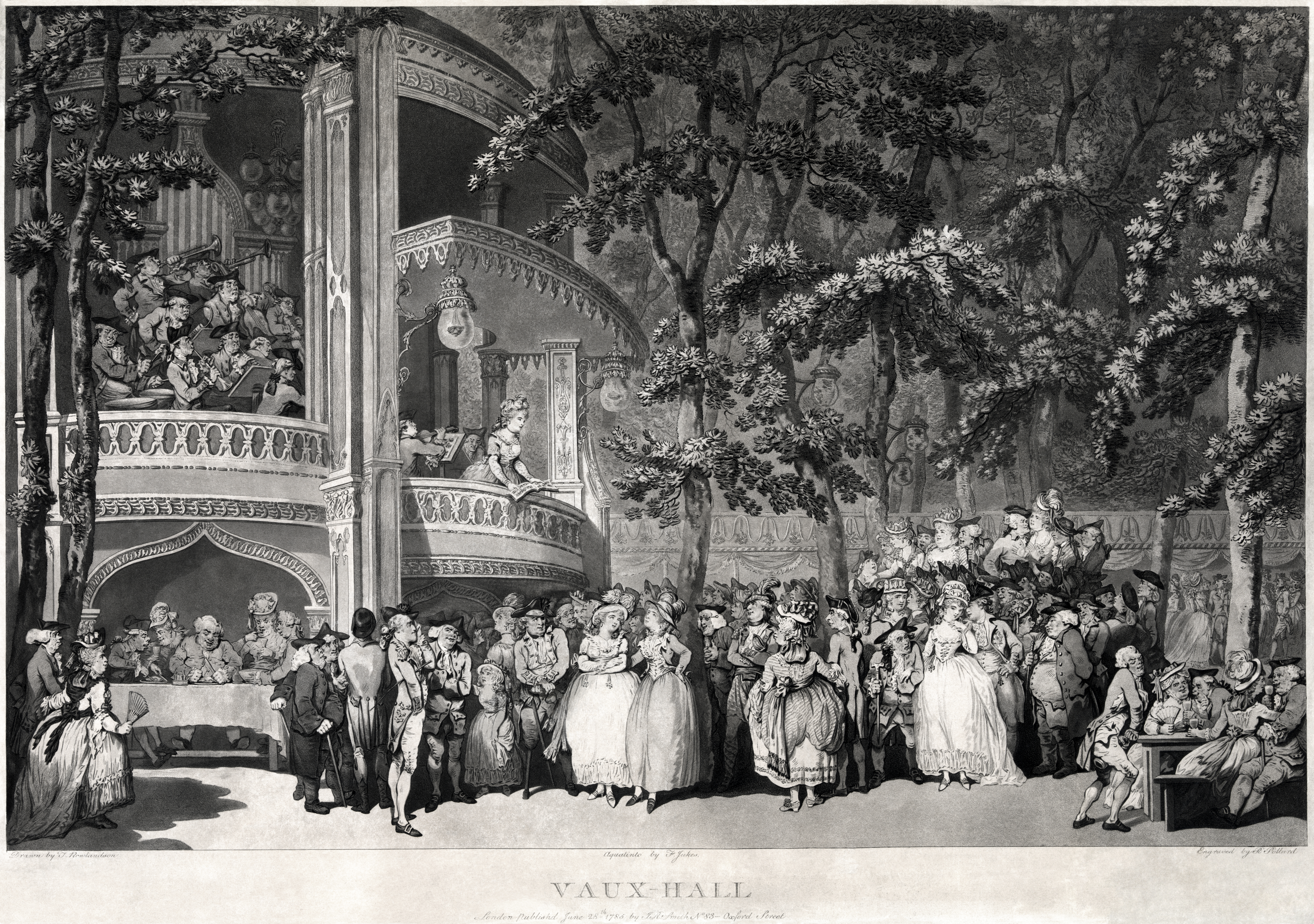
A concert at Vauxhall Gardens, depicted by Thomas Rowlandson in 1785

One of the most popular places to go for entertainment in London was Vauxhall Gardens, which reopened with new management in 1732 as the "New Spring Gardens". 18th-century Londoners could also visit assembly rooms such as the Pantheon on Oxford Street, where people could enjoy Vauxhall Garden-style activities such as dances and masquerades in all weathers.

Bull baiting and bear baiting were popular pastimes, with more exotic animals being brought in occasionally. For example, in 1747, a former boxer called John Broughton advertised a tiger baiting on Oxford Street. Areas around London also held annual fairs, such as Bartholomew Fair and Southwark Fair, which was abolished in 1762. One attraction of Southwark Fair was the acrobat Mr Cadman, who walked across a rope tied from building to building over the street. Occasionally, the winter was cold enough to make the Thames freeze completely, allowing for "frost fairs" on the ice, such as in 1789, when a bearbaiting took place on the ice, and an ox was roasted whole at Shadwell.

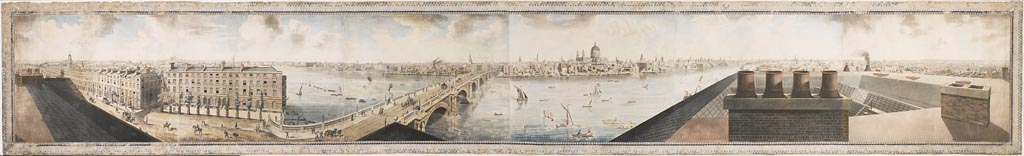
Robert Barker's 1792 panorama of London, drawn from the roof of a flour mill at the south end of Blackfriars Bridge

Towards the end of the period, hot air balloon flights became a regular feature of London's entertainment offering, with the first balloon launch in England taking place in 1783 at the Artillery Ground near Finsbury Square. This first attempt was unmanned; the first manned balloon flight in the country was undertaken the following year from the same place by Vincenzo Lunardi. Another fashionable entertainment at the end of the period was the panorama, wherein 360-degree drawings of countryside views, cityscapes or battlefields would be exhibited in round rooms, giving the viewer the impression that they were standing on top of a high point in the landscape or on a tall building. The Irish artist Robert Barker began this trend, and in fact coined the term panorama, in the 1790s.

=== Literature ===
London played host to many important writers of the 18th century such as Jonathan Swift, Alexander Pope, Henry Fielding, Edmund Burke, Oliver Goldsmith, Fanny Burney, and Daniel Defoe. Londoners such as Mary Astell and Mary Wollstonecraft wrote early feminist works, and poets such as Stephen Duck wrote about the working-class.

Britain's first daily newspaper, the Daily Courant, was sold 1702–1735 from Ludgate Hill. The Tatler, a society paper, first appeared 1709–1711. Gentleman's Magazine began publication in 1731 and continued until 1907. The first English Sunday newspaper, the British Gazette and Sunday Monitor, began publication in 1780. The Times was founded in 1785 as the Daily Universal Register, and The Observer in 1791.

In 1755, Samuel Johnson published one of the first dictionaries of the English language, which had taken him eight years to write from his house in Gough Square. Johnson's dictionary attempted to be more comprehensive than previous attempts, and included quotations showing where each word had come from.

=== Theatre ===
What is now the Theatre Royal Haymarket opened in 1705 as the Queen's Theatre. The Royal Opera House first opened in 1732 as the Covent Garden Theatre.

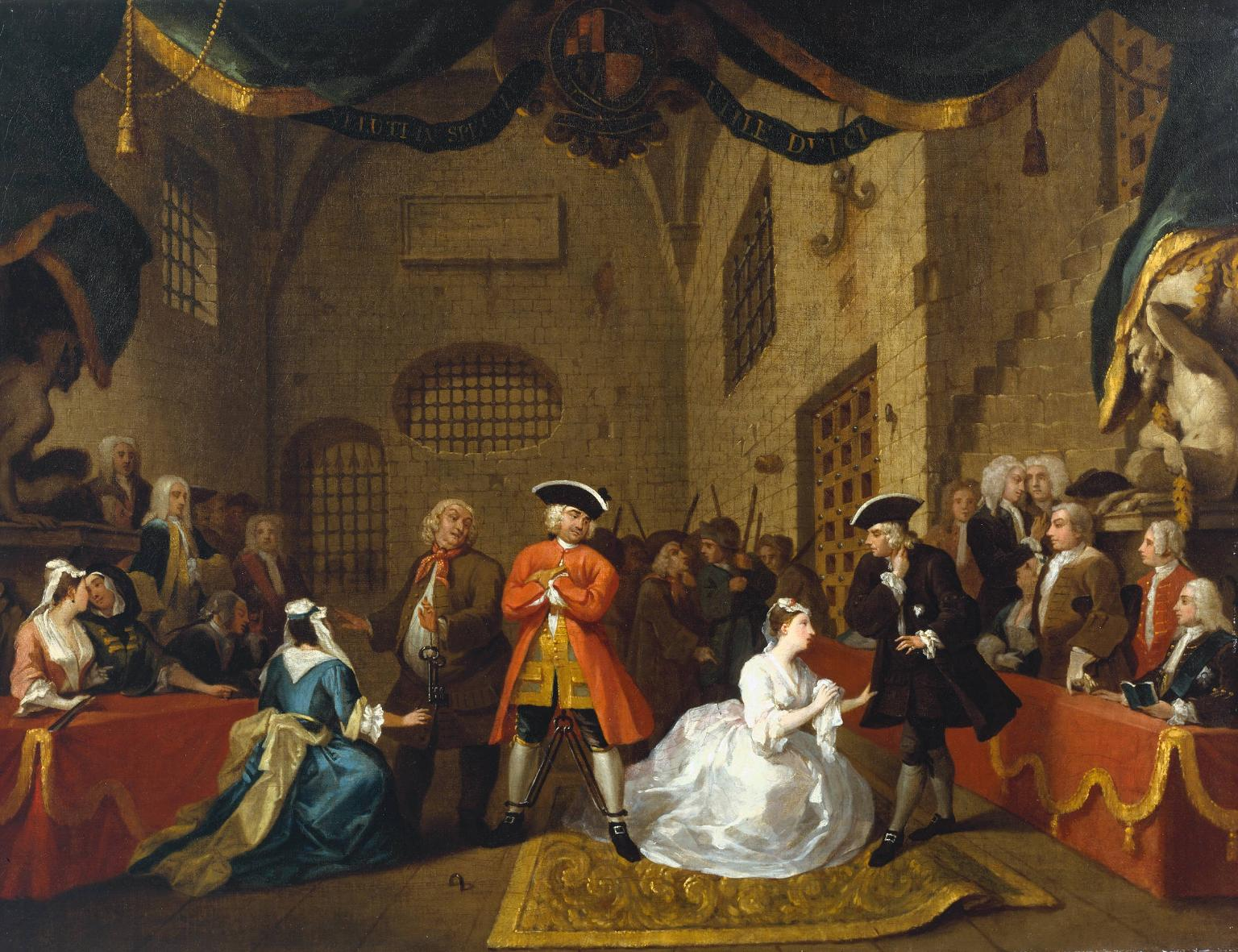
A scene from The Beggar's Opera by William Hogarth, c. 1728

1728 saw the opening of The Beggar's Opera at Lincoln's Inn Fields. Unlike the Italian-style operas that London audiences were used to, this used well-known folk songs and hymns from the time with the lyrics changed, so that audiences could sing along. It ran for 60 performances, considered a very long run at the time. One particularly famous star of the stage in the period was David Garrick, who had his debut in 1741 at Goodman's Fields Theatre. The famous actress Sarah Siddons first appeared at the Drury Lane Theatre in 1775, playing Portia in The Merchant of Venice. This period also saw the rise of famous playwrights such as Richard Brinsley Sheridan, whose play The Rivals opened at Covent Garden in the same year.

After the 1737 Licensing Act, all plays where the audience were charged for tickets had to be licensed by the Lord Chamberlain, a national censorship that lasted until 1968.

Pantomime has its origins in 18th-century London theatre, with The Tavern Bilkers at the Theatre Royal Drury Lane in 1702 being a possible candidate for the world's first pantomime.

== Health and medicine ==
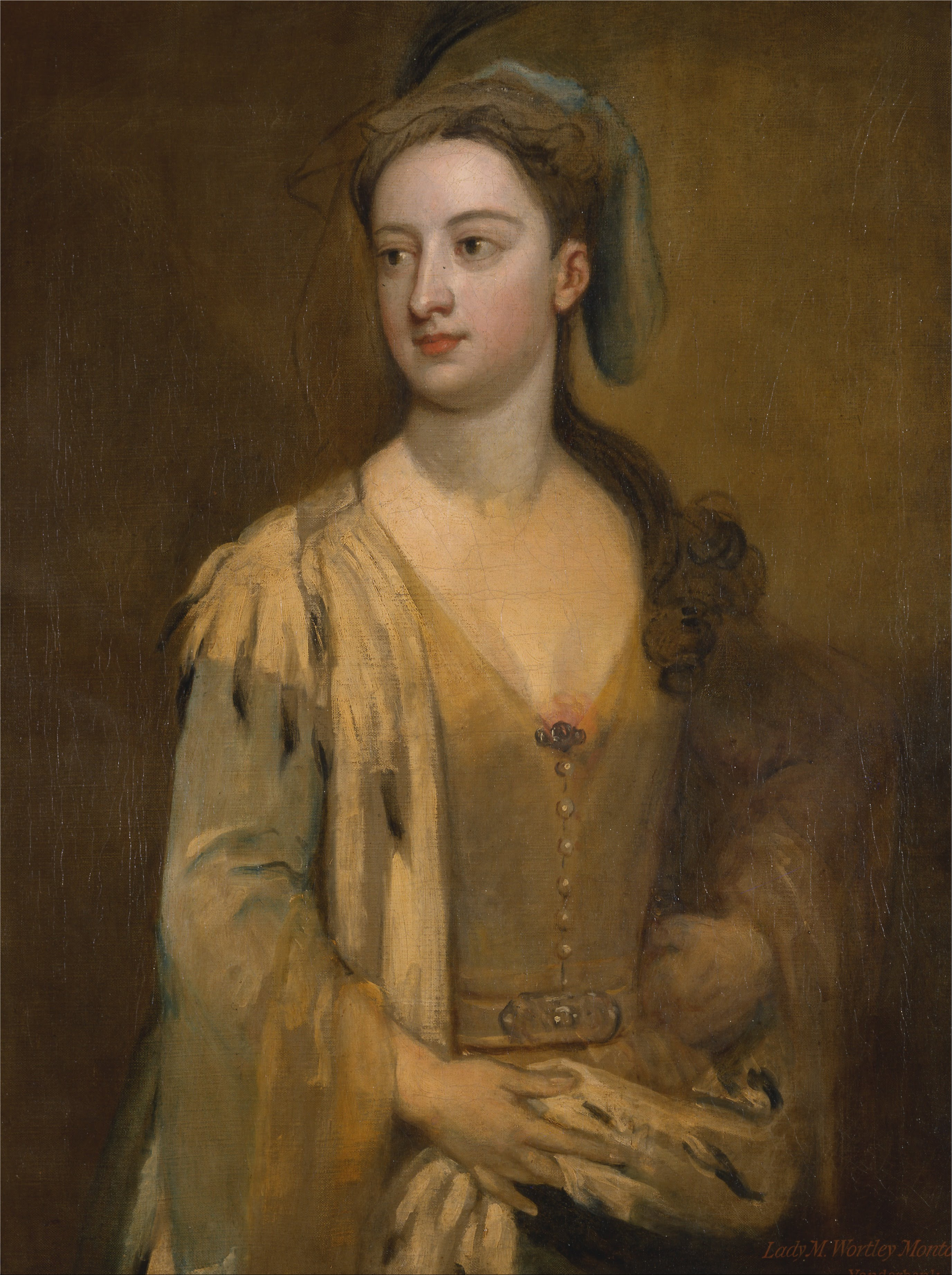
Mary Wortley Montagu (Godfrey Kneller, 1715–1720), who pioneered smallpox inoculation in 1720s London

In 1720, Lady Mary Wortley Montagu returned to London from travels in the Ottoman Empire, where she acquired knowledge of smallpox inoculation. In 1721, she had her three-year-daughter publicly inoculated by the surgeon Charles Maitland at the Royal College of Physicians. This resulted in a short-lived wave of popularity for inoculation among the wealthy in London, including the Princess of Wales.

Many new people were training to become surgeons, and needed corpses to practice on and learn from. From 1752, the bodies of six hanged criminals were given to the Royal College of Surgeons for this purpose each year, but this was nowhere near the number required. In 1767, Dr William Hunter opened a School of Anatomy in Great Windmill Street to showcase dissections for medical students. This need created demand for a class of criminal known as bodysnatchers, who stole recently deceased bodies from graveyards. In response, some churches built watchhouses and hired guards.

Excessive drinking was a common hazard to Londoners' health, particularly during the Gin Craze in the first half of the century. In 1720, London's distilleries produced 2.5 million gallons of spirits per year. Newspapers such as the London Journal attributed several deaths to gin-drinking, such as that of a porter in Holborn who "drank so plentifully of Geneva, with his wife, that he died upon the spot [...] 'tis said that they drank three pints apiece, in a little more than an hour".

A Whitechapel stationer and rag merchant, William Addis, is credited with inventing the toothbrush in 1780.

=== Healthcare ===
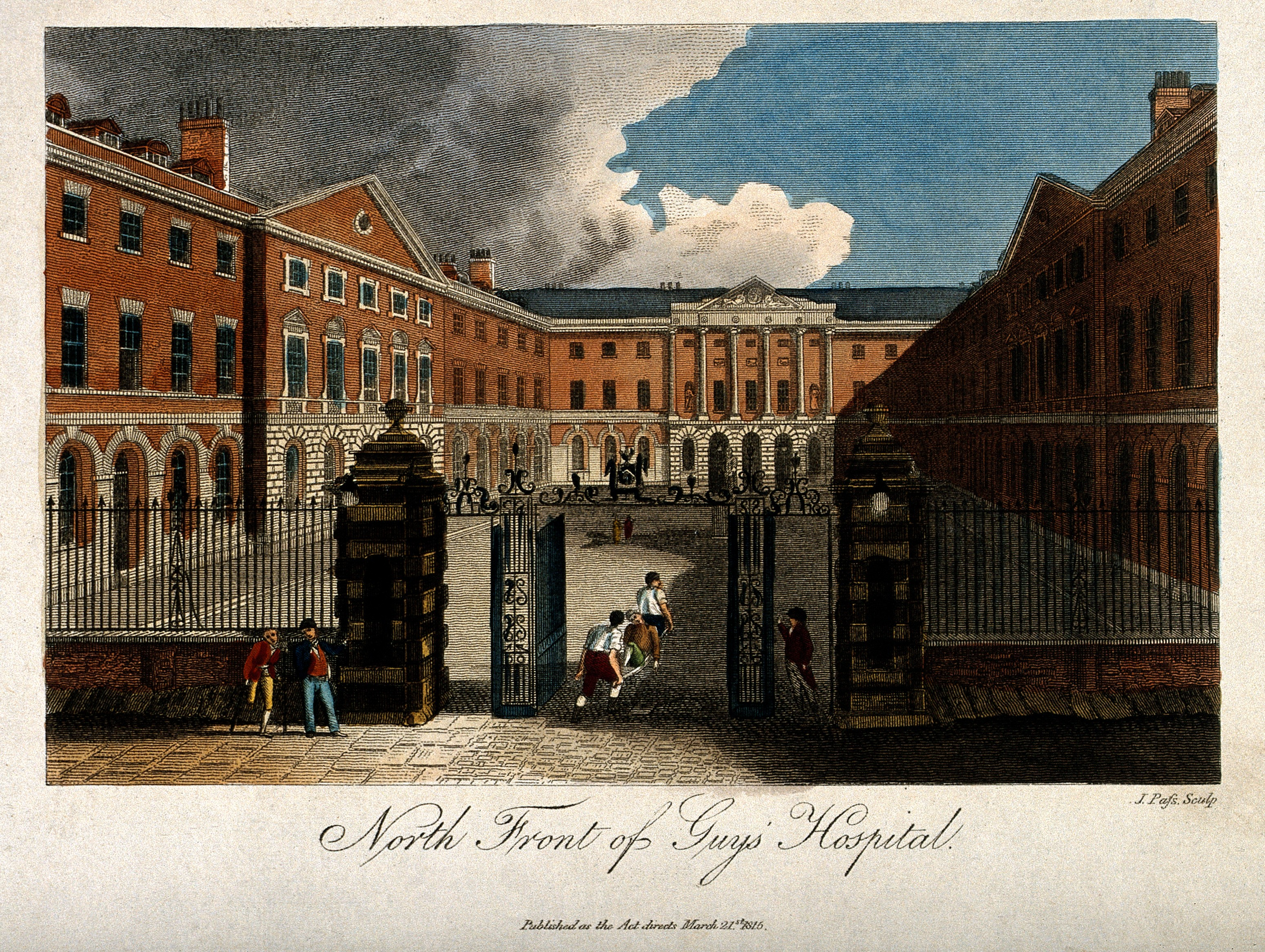
The courtyard of Guy's Hospital, by J. Pass, 1799

At the beginning of the period, London had two main hospitals: St. Bartholomew's and St. Thomas's. Beginning in the 1720s, there was a movement to build new hospitals using charitable donations, which were called "voluntary" hospitals. Donors could nominate patients to receive free treatment. In 1720, Westminster Hospital was opened in Petty France. 1725 saw the opening of Guy's Hospital, which was originally intended for up to 400 poor patients with incurable conditions, which other hospitals such as St. Thomas' would not treat at the time. St. George's Hospital was founded in 1733, and the London Hospital in 1740. In 1739, Britain's first midwifery school was opened at St. James's workhouse infirmary. Middlesex Hospital opened in 1745 on Windmill Street with just 18 beds. The London Hospital moved to large new buildings on Whitechapel Road in the 1750s, where they still are to this day.

From the 1750s, there was a wave of new maternity or "lying-in" hospitals, beginning with the British Lying-In Hospital in 1749, and further examples being built in 1750, 1752, and 1765. London had a smallpox hospital at Coldbath Fields from the 1740s, which moved to St. Pancras in 1794. London's main lunatic asylum, the Bethlehem Royal Hospital (better known as Bedlam) long predates this period, but in 1770 it banned the longstanding practice of allowing tourists to pay to view its inmates. The hospital still operates in London to this day. England's first veterinary college was also founded in this period- the Royal Veterinary College, originally based in Camden in 1791.

Another way people could get medical help in this period was through dispensaries. A dispensary was an organisation that provided medical help using money donated by wealthy people. These donors could then write letters of recommendation to allow poorer people to access treatment. The first free dispensary in London was founded in Red Lion Square in 1769.

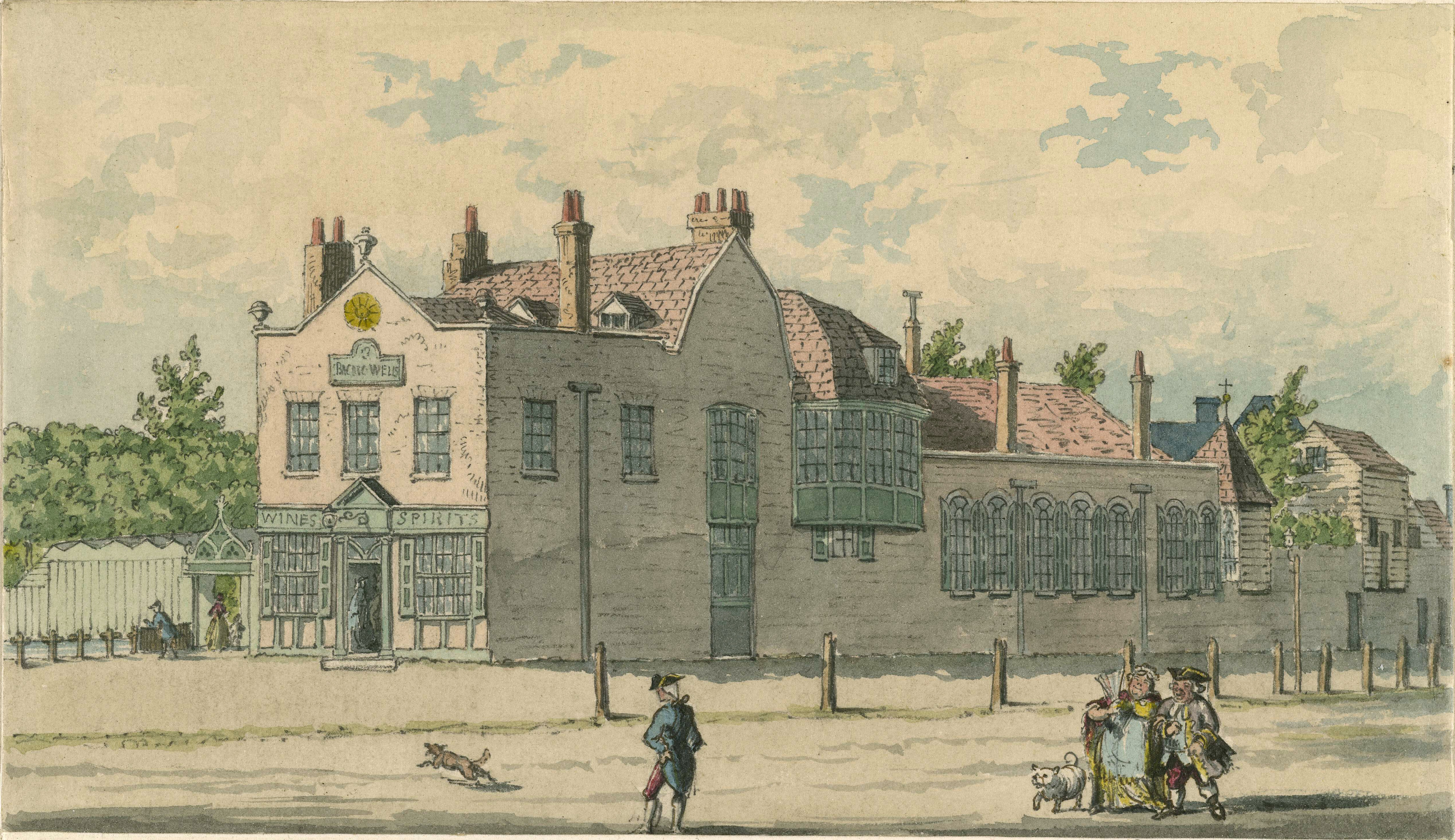
The spa at Bagnigge Wells, by Samuel Hieronymous Grimm

King's Cross had several springs which were thought to have medicinal qualities. In 1759, the Bagnigge Wells opened, with a pump room where visitors could drink the water, play skittles, and hear concerts. Water could be bought for 3d per gallon. In 1770, a spa was also founded in Bermondsey, near what is now known as Spa Road.

== Business and industry ==
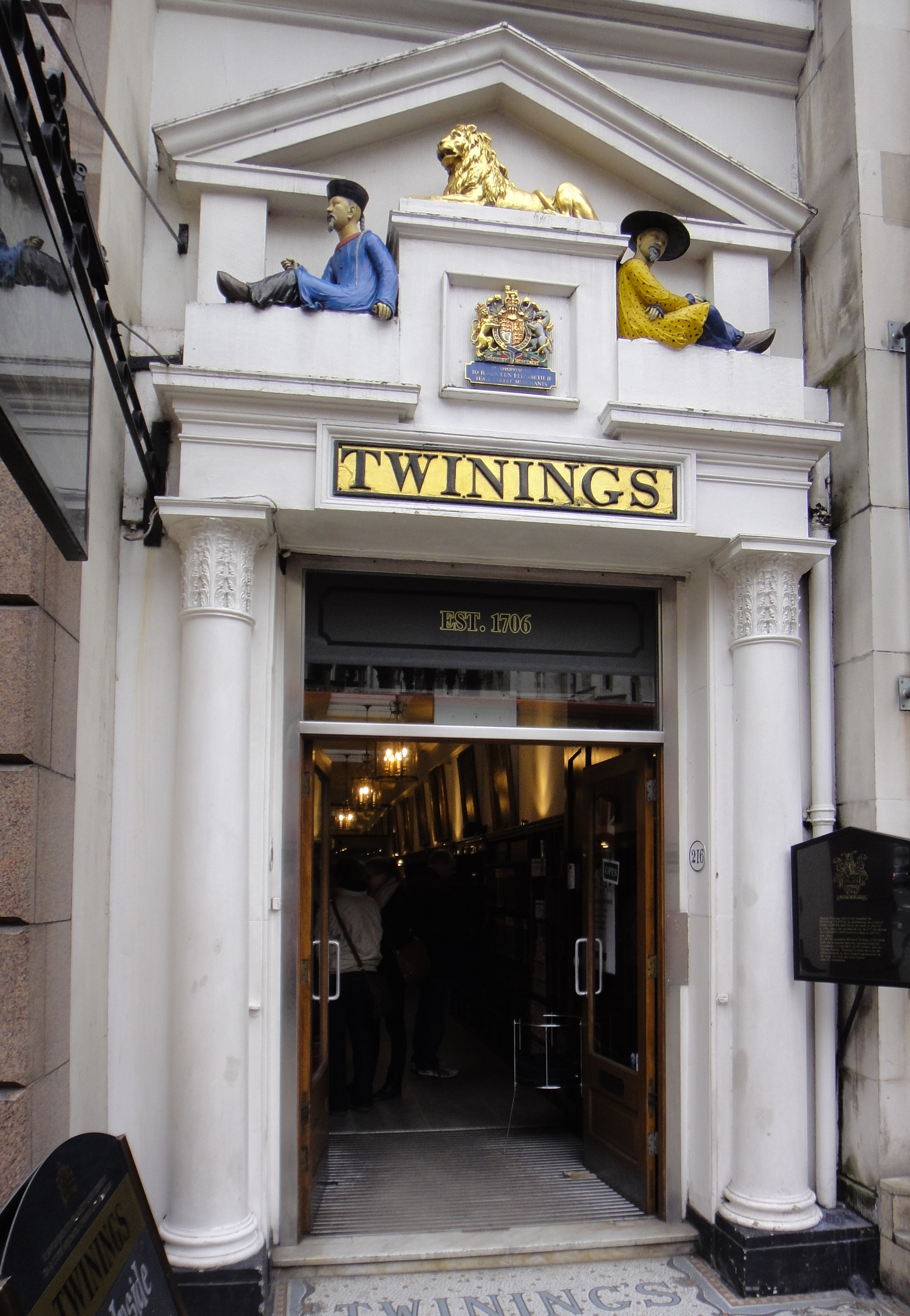
Entrance to the Twinings tea shop, which has operated on the Strand since the early 18th century

Several long-standing London business trace their history back to this period, including the department store Fortnum & Mason (1707), tea shop Twinings (1717), the auction house Sotheby's (1744), the wine merchants Justerini & Brooks (1749), the opticians Dolland & Aitchison (1750), the auction house Christie's (1766), the publisher John Murray (1768), the newsagent's WHSmith (1792), the auction house Bonhams (1793), the soda manufacturer Schweppes (1794), and the bookshop Hatchards (1797).

In September 1720, stock in the South Sea Company collapsed. Many wealthy Londoners lost large amounts of money (the Duke of Chandos lost £700,000), and in January 1721, one newspaper suggested that data on the number of suicides caused by the crash should be collected.

The 18th century saw the rise and fall of London's silk trade, run in chief by Protestant Huguenot families fleeing persecution in Catholic France and setting up silk looms in Spitalfields. In the 1710s, calico fabric imported from India began to undercut London silk, and in 1719, 4,000 Spitalfields silkweavers rioted in an anti-calico demonstration, throwing ink and acid at women wearing calico fabric. Throughout the century, silk weavers continued to protest and riot against the intrusion of cheaper fabrics into their market, and against poor treatment by weaving masters. In 1763, a group of silkweavers broke into their master's house, broke his looms, cut up his bolts of silk, and burned the master in effigy. In the aftermath of one silkweavers' riot in 1769, two leaders were hanged at Newgate Prison. Silkweavers also celebrated victories, such as the law passed in 1766 banning French silk from being imported. Silkweavers processed through the streets playing "God Save The King", and lit bonfires and fireworks.

A huge portion of London's economy was built through trade, particularly shipping. In 1790, 70% of Britain's imports and 56% of its exports came through the capital. Ships coming to London were required to dock at the legal quays in the "Pool of London", a complex of many tiny quays and wharves along the side of the Thames from London Bridge to the Tower. This was extremely congested, and so throughout the period, more docks were added elsewhere along the river, such as Greenland Dock in Rotherhithe and the East India Company's dock at Blackwall. Some London companies and individuals profited through colonial exploits around the world, notably in the Caribbean and India. For example, twice-Lord Mayor William Beckford was from a family of Jamaican plantation owners, at the time of his death owned 3,000 people across 13 plantations, and was supposedly the first English commoner to be a millionnaire upon his death. The East India Company was based at Leadenhall Street, and alone accounted for 19% of British imports by value in the last quarter of the century.

The London Stock Exchange was founded in 1773 in Threadneedle Street.

== Transport ==
The 18th century in Britain is often referred to as being subject to "turnpike mania", wherein many roads were placed in the custody of private trusts, who set up tollbooths along the road to pay for its upkeep. London's first turnpikes were set up in 1711: along Edgware Road from Kilburn to Hertfordshire, and the road from Highgate to Barnet. By 1720, there were five more: between Shoreditch and Enfield; Tyburn and Uxbridge; Kensington and Staines and Colnbrook; Southwark to Greenwich and Lewisham; and Westminster to New Cross.

Towards the end of the period, canals began to be constructed across London to allow for the movement of goods. The Limehouse Cut was opened in 1770 to allow boats from Hertfordshire to reach London's docks without having to go round the Isle of Dogs.

As bridges across the Thames were few and congested, many Londoners crossed the river on taxi-boats operated by watermen. These watermen sometimes held rowing races, and in 1715, a comic actor called Thomas Doggett offered a cash prize and a new coat and badge to the winner of a race between newly qualified watermen. This race, called Doggett's Coat and Badge, is still held annually in London to this day.

== Education ==
The Society for Promoting Christian Knowledge was founded just before the beginning of this period in 1699, and ran charity schools throughout the century to provide education to London's poorest children. By the end of the century, there were 179 such schools in the city. In 1758, the Orphan Working School was founded in Hoxton to teach children job skills such as shoemaking, as well as literacy and religion. In 1782, the Surrey Chapel opened on Blackfriars Road with 13 Sunday schools, which provided education for 3,000 children. 18th-century London saw England's first school for deaf and mute children, founded in 1792 in Bermondsey.

Several long-running adult education institutions were also founded in this period, such as the Linnean Society and the Royal Institution.

== See also ==
- Timeline of 18th century London

== Sources ==
- Ackroyd, Peter (2000), London: The Biography, New York: Penguin Books
- Weinreb, Ben; Hibbert, Christopher; Keay, John; Keay, Julia (2008). The London Encyclopaedia (2nd ed.). Pan Macmillan. ISBN 978-1-405-04924-5.
