= Conduit Street =

Street in the City of Westminster, England

Coordinates: 51.5121°N 0.1421°W

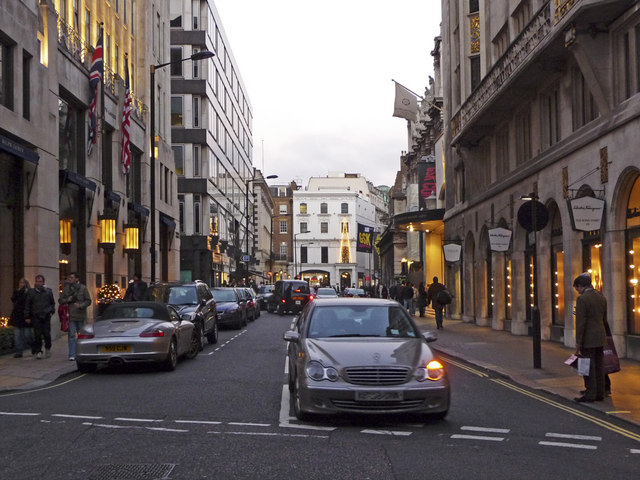
- Conduit Street at the junction with New Bond Street
- Interactive map of Conduit Street
- Length: 1,100 ft (340 m)
- Location: City of Westminster, London, England
- From: Regent Street
- Major junctions: St. George Street, Savile Row
- To: Bond Street, Bruton Street

Conduit Street is a street in Mayfair, London. It connects Bond Street to Regent Street.

== History ==
The street was first developed in the early 18th century on the Conduit Mead Estate, which the Corporation of London had owned since the 15th century; it was a popular place for upper-class Londoners to socialise. Around 1890 Conduit Street had the most tailoring firms in what was known as the Golden Mile of bespoke tailoring. It stretched from Piccadilly and Sackville Street in the south, though and around Savile Row and up to Hanover Square. There were also dressmakers and jewellers.

Conduit Street was hit by a number of bombs in the 2nd World War. Many properties have since been demolished and rebuilt, but a handful have survived.

The MP Charles James Fox was born on Conduit Street in 1749.

== Properties ==
- No. 9 Conduit Street was built for the MP Robert Vyner in 1779. It was built by James Wyatt and is now Grade II* listed. The building served as the headquarters of the Royal Institute of British Architects from 1859 until 1934.
- No. 16 Conduit Street was a public house (The Coach & Horses) from the 1780s until at least 1910. The current building dates from 1900.
- Nos. 19 and 20 are on the site of Warne's Hotel, destroyed by a fire on the afternoon of 29 January 1809. It extended to the back premises, close to the gates of St George's Church, Hanover Square, which was thought to be under threat from the fire.
- Nos. 42 and 43 are listed early to mid 18th century terraced houses.
- No. 44 was the London office of the Oxford University Press Music Department in the 1950s.
- No 57 was home to bespoke tailors JB & F Wells from 1890 to 1944. The firm was started by brothers James and Fred Wells in 1880 initially at No 24. They moved needing bigger premises. The firm were tailors, naval and military outfitters. Their customers would include Jan Smuts a South African statesman, military leader and philosopher, serving as prime minister of the Union of South Africa twice in 1919 and 1939. The firm would have to move in 1944 when Nos 57-59 were destroyed by a V1 rocket in the 2nd World War. Sidney Wells then leading the firm moved into 47 Maddox Street with his great uncle William Cooling Lawrence firm, Cooling, Lawrence and Sons. William and Sidney would enter into a partnership creating a new firm Cooling, Lawrence and Wells in 1945.
