= John Price (executioner) =

John Price (c. 1677 – 31 May 1718) was an English hangman who was himself hanged for murder. He was born in London and apprenticed at an early age to a dealer in "scraps and rags" until the death of his master two years later. Little else is known of Price's early life except that he went to sea and served on Royal Navy men-of-war.

Price appears to have lived constantly on the edge of the law; on one occasion in 1715, after executing three men at Tyburn, he was arrested for debt. His earnings, tips, and sales that day helped him to avoid prison, but eventually his financial problems led to his imprisonment in Marshalsea, in Southwark, London. After a few months of incarceration, Price and an accomplice managed to escape by digging a hole in the prison wall. Shortly afterwards in 1718 he killed a man, and then savagely attacked and beat a woman named Elizabeth White in Bunhill Fields; she died of her injuries four days later. Price was apprehended and found guilty of her murder. He was held in Newgate Prison for five weeks before his execution on 31 May 1718. The Weekly Journal reported an account by the hangman that a few days before Price's execution he had raped a young girl who had taken food to his cell.
