= John Noorthouck =

John Noorthouck (1732–1816) was an English author, best known as a topographer of London.

== Life ==
Born in London, he was the son of Herman Noorthouck, a bookseller who had a shop, the Cicero's Head, Great Piazza, Covent Garden, and whose stock was sold off in 1730. Early in life John Noorthouck was patronised by Owen Ruffhead and William Strahan the printer. He gained his livelihood as an index-maker and corrector of the press. He was for almost fifty years a liveryman of the Company of Stationers, and spent most of his life in London, living in 1773 in Barnard's Inn, Holborn.

In 1784, whilst living in Barnard's Inn, John Noorthouck describes himself as a Freemason. In the book Noorthouck's Masonry, the Editor "J.N." states in the Preface starting at page vii, "The present editor esteems it a duty incumbent on him to advertise his brethren of the general alterations the following work has undergone with a view to improvement." The Preface ends with the details, "May 1, 1784, Bernard's Inn, London". In 1814, Noorthouck was living at Oundle, Northamptonshire, where he died about July 1816.

== Works ==
His major work was A New History of London, including Westminster and Southwark, London, 1773, 4to, with copperplates. This book gives a history of London at all periods and a survey of the existing buildings. Noorthouck also published An Historical and Classical Dictionary,’ 2 vols. London, 1776, consisting of biographies of persons of all periods and countries.

John Russell Smith in London, April 1852, offered for sale an unprinted autobiography by Noorthouck; it was later acquired by Yale University. Noorthouck revised the Constitutions of the Antient Fraternity of Free and Accepted Masons, the constitutions of the Premier Grand Lodge of England first compiled by James Anderson in 1723, and Noorthouck's edition was published by J. Rozea in 1784. The title page states that the revision was prepared under the direction of the Hall Committee. The preface to this book is signed 'J. N.', and it is dated Bernard's Inn (presumably Barnard's Inn), May 1, 1784.

== Notes ==
Attribution

This article incorporates text from a publication now in the public domain: Wroth, Warwick William (1895). "Noorthouck, John". In Lee, Sidney (ed.). Dictionary of National Biography. Vol. 41. London: Smith, Elder & Co.
