= A Rake's Progress, 3: The Tavern Scene =

Painting by William Hogarth from the series A Rake's Progress

The Tavern Scene
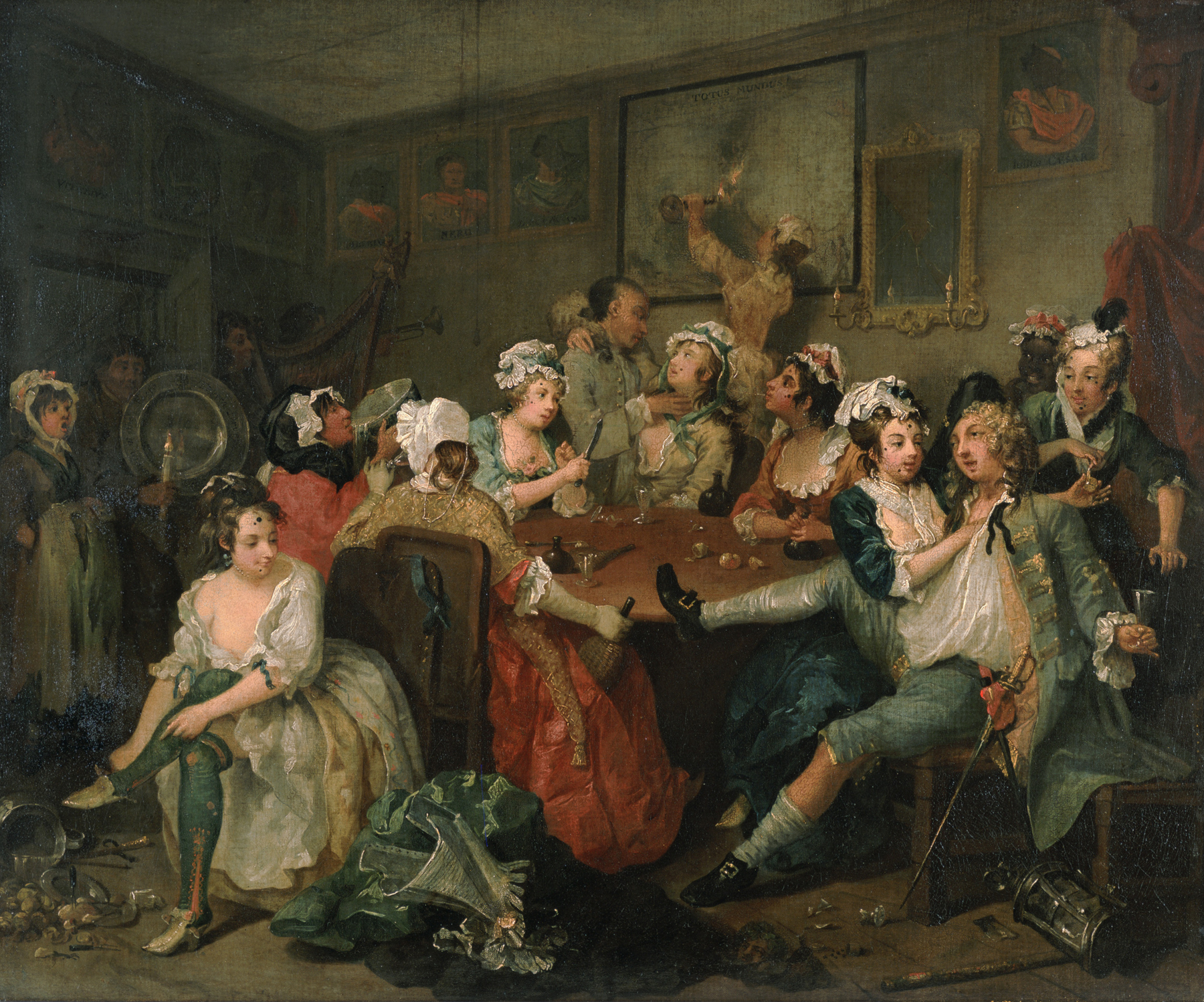
- Year: 1732-33
- Medium: oil on canvas
- Dimensions: 62.5 cm × 75 cm (24.6 in × 30 in)
- Location: Sir John Soane's Museum, London

Tavern Scene or The Orgy is a work by the English artist William Hogarth from 1735, the third picture from the series A Rake's Progress.

A Rake's Progress totals eight oil paintings from 1732 to 1733. They were published as engravings from 1734. The series depicts the fictional Tom Rakewell's decline and fall. He was the free spending son and heir of a rich merchant. In the story, he comes to London, wasting his money on luxurious life, buying the services of prostitutes and gambling. He ends up in Fleet Prison, and finally at the Bethlem Hospital, or Bedlam.

== Painting ==
The picture, which draws from the merry company tradition of painting, shows the beginning of Tom Rakewell's way down. It depicts a riotous scene on the combined brothel and the restaurant Rose Tavern at Drury Lane in Covent Garden at three o'clock in the morning.

The protagonist Tom, drunk with his sword at his side and surrounded by prostitutes, is sprawling in a chair, with one foot on a table. Beside him is a rod and lantern, which he stole during his nocturnal wanderings in the streets. Two of the women are stealing Tom's watch. In the doorway a female street singer makes an appearance.

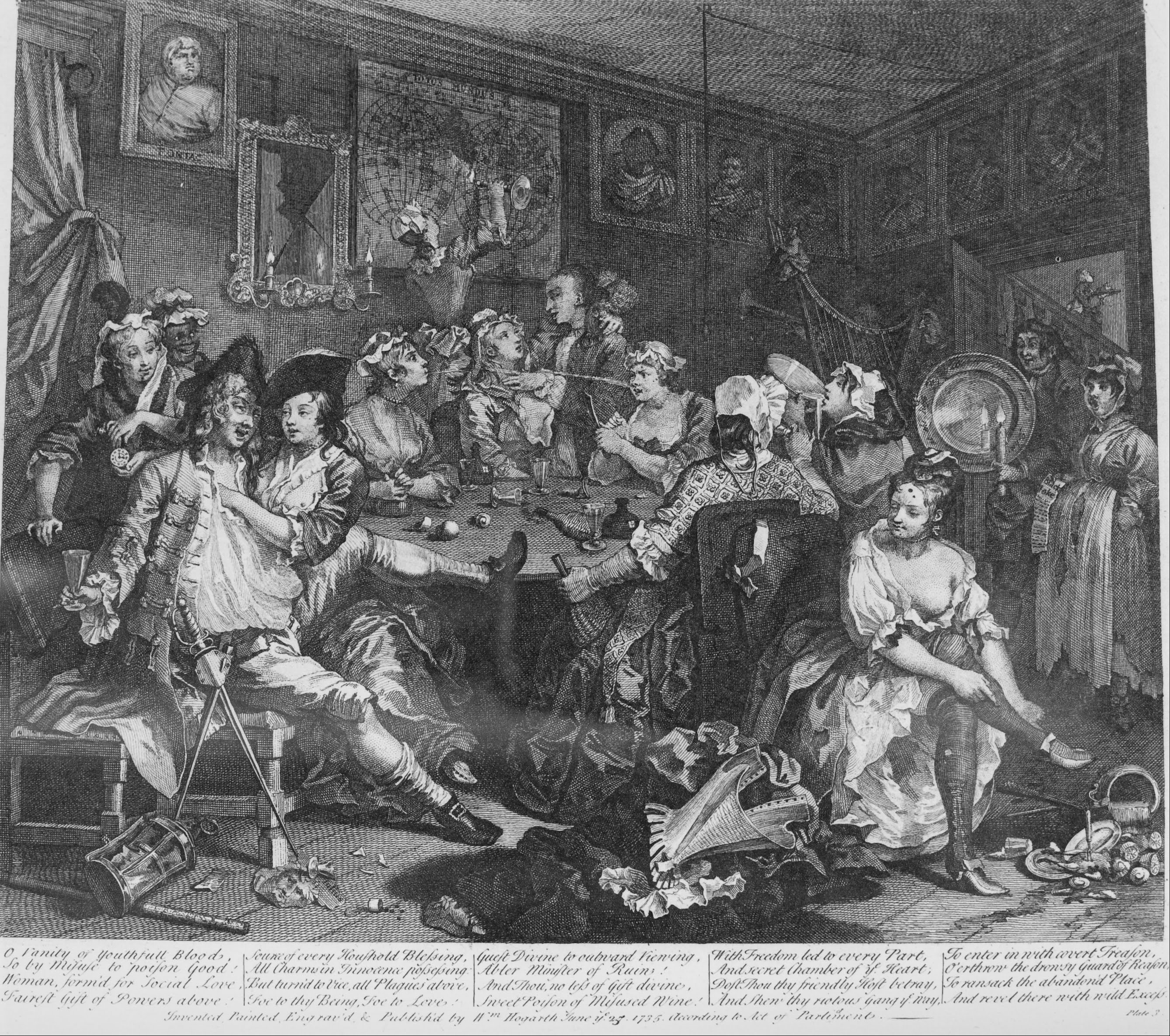
A Rake's Progress, Plate 3, The Tavern Scene, engraving with etching, 1735

On one of the walls, hangs a world map and framed prints of among others the Roman emperors Augustus, Titus, Otho, Vitellius and Vespasian.

== Provenance ==
The eight paintings in the series were sold by William Beckford at an auction at Christie's in 1802 for 570 guineas to John Soane. They then hung at Soane's country house Pitzhanger Manor, and from 1810 in Soane's town house in Lincoln's Inn Fields. The Brothel painting scene and the other seven paintings in the series are available in the picture gallery in the city residence, now converted to Sir John Soane's Museum.

== Opera ==
Hogarth's picture suite has been used as the basis for the English opera The Rake's Progress, with libretto by W.H. Auden and Chester Kallman and with music by Igor Stravinsky. Stravinsky had noted William Hogarth's pictures at an exhibition in Chicago in 1947, and got the idea to write an opera on the theme.

== See also ==
- List of works by William Hogarth
