= Conduit Mead Estate =

Estate in the City of London

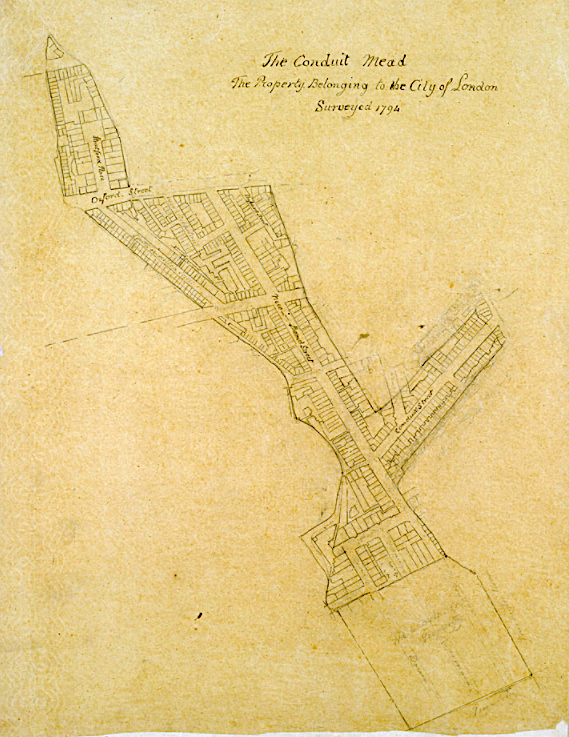
Map of Conduit Mead Estate, 1794

The Conduit Mead Estate is a 27-acre estate owned by the City of London Corporation located in Mayfair. Its principal thoroughfares are Conduit Street and Bond Street.

In the seventeenth century this was a field beside the River Tyburn which contained a spring. The land was owned by the Crown but leased to the City of London so as to draw water from the spring.
