= Bespoke (disambiguation) =

Bespoke is an adjective for anything commissioned to a particular specification.

Specific uses include:

- Bespoke medicine, a movement to better fit treatment to the individual patient
- Bespoke portfolio (CDO), a portfolio designed to meet the requirements of a specific investor
  - Bespoke CDO, a bespoke, synthetic CDO
- Bespoke shoes
- Bespoke software, software written to the specific requirement of a customer
- Bespoke tailoring, men's clothing made to the individual measurements of the customer

== Arts, entertainment, and media ==
- Bespoke (album), an album by Daedelus released in April 2011

== Companies ==
- Bespoke Arcades, a British manufacturer of custom-built arcade machines
- Bespoke Collection, a wine producer and lifestyle brand based in Yountville, California
- Bespoked, promoter of custom-made bicycles from Bristol, UK
