= Hong Kong tailors =

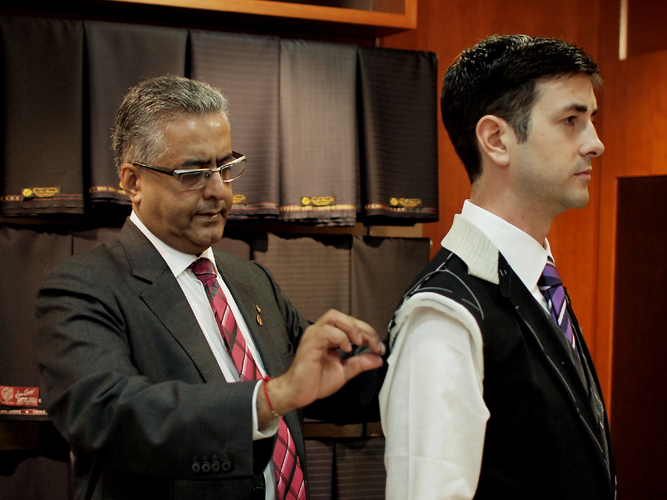
R Daswani, a Hong Kong tailor, fitting a customer. Some Hong Kong tailors now use 3D body scanners

The Hong Kong tailors are well-known for producing bespoke men's clothing, particularly suits, in that city. Some are famous for offering a "24-hour suit" for rushed travelers, although most suits involve 2-3 fittings, each a day apart. Many of the Hong Kong tailors visit the United States and the United Kingdom to take measurements and show fabric samples, with the final suit delivered by parcel.

Tailoring for the upper class in Hong Kong goes back to 1920s where there were about 600 people engaged in the business. During 1960s there were as many as 15,000 tailors. In 1966, the South China Morning Post ran a headline declaring that London's Savile Row, until then the undisputed international center of bespoke tailoring, had been replaced by Hong Kong. In the 1970s and 80s, ready-made suits became widely available, causing a decline in the number of tailors. Hong Kong remains a major location where travelers consider getting a suit.

Hari Harilela of the Harilela Group, now major Hong Kong financiers, started a clothing-cum-tailoring shop in Hong Kong during the 1940s and 50s. He pioneered the idea of supplying custom-made suits by mail order. He realised in 1960 that the mail order boom is a temporary phase, so he diversified into real estate. A number of Indians, mainly from Sindh, arrived in 1950, who are still in the tailoring business. Many tailors, such as Yuen's Tailor, are ethnic Chinese.

A notable establishment is Sam's Tailor, who in their own right have stitched suits for foreign politicians like Bill Clinton, George W Bush, Margaret Thatcher, Tony Blair and Bob Hawke and celebrities like King Charles, Kevin Spacey, Boris Becker, David Bowie, Richard Gere and Michael Jackson.

By the mid-2020s Hong Kong still has hundreds of shops that carry the word “tailor” on their signs, especially along Nathan Road and inside the arcade buildings of Tsim Sha Tsui and Central. Quality, however, varies dramatically: many are now tourist-oriented volume operations or alteration services, while only a small handful continue to operate at the level that once made the city the undisputed world capital of bespoke suiting.

== Traveling tailors ==
Many Hong Kong tailors travel to the United States, the United Kingdom, France, Australia and Japan. Traveling tailors provide a more personal service to their customers and give the customers an opportunity to see the fabric samples and meet the tailor in person. Traveling tailors travel between cities and station in a local luxury hotel for a short period of time to meet and provide the same tailoring services they would provide in their local store. In the hotel, the customer will be able to select the fabric from samples and the tailor will take the measurements himself. The order then will be shipped to the customer within three to four weeks' time. Unlike local tailoring, if further alterations are required the garment must be shipped.

== See also ==
- Bespoke tailoring
- Savile Row tailoring
- Ascot Chang
- Raja Fashions
- Shanghainese people in Hong Kong
