= Bivolino =

Belgian clothing manufacturer

Bivolino.com
- Type: Private
- Industry: Clothing; E-commerce
- Founded: Hasselt, Belgium (April 4, 1954)
- Founder: Louis Bijvoet; Jacques Bijvoet
- Headquarters: Hasselt, Belgium
- Key people: Mike Bivolino (CEO)
- Products: Shirts; Made-to-measure; Bespoke
- Website: bivolino.com

Bivolino, founded in 1954, is a Belgian clothing manufacturer, specializing in customized made-to-measure dress shirts. Bivolino was founded by the brothers Louis and Jacques Bijvoet. On 13 October 1987 the company was passed over to Michel Bijvoet.

== History ==
Brothers Louis and Jacques Bijvoet founded the company in 1954 with a joint investment of 8 million Belgian franks. Their grandfather, Jacques Bijvoet, had been in the linen trade since 1900 and the name Bivolino was chosen to represent both the family name of Bijvoet and linen. They based the company in Hasselt – Belgium. Under the direction of the Bijvoet brothers, the company, a small plant with 80 employees, produced 350.000 shirts a year. At this point, export to the Netherlands, Luxemburg, Germany and Switzerland represented 35% of the business.
In 1969, Bivolino introduced a new ergonomic measurement system, allowing each shirt to be individually fitted to the body. This system was the first of its kind in Europe, and was created in partnership with IBM. In 1981, Bivolino became the first shirt label to take steps towards computerised production, which automatically produces the pattern making gradations. By now, and using this technology, Bivolino was producing 900.000 shirts a year and employing 270 people. On 13 October 1987 a fire ruined the Bivolino plant in Hasselt. Over the next year, sales decreased by 80%. As the company struggled to recover, production was moved to Tunisia and Romania.

During this time, the Bijvoet brothers decided to pass on the family business to Louis’ son, Michel Bijvoet. The growth of the internet opened up new possibilities for Bivolino and the brand established a new digital studio at the Limburg Science Park. In 1997 the first bespoke shirt was sold via their online shop, Bivolino.com. In 2000, after two years of anthropometric research, Bivolino launched their biometric sizing technology, which could calculate the cut and size for every Bivolino customer, without using a measurement tape. In 2010, Bivolino launched its latest piece of technology, a 3D shirt design platform. See www.BivolinoServices.com .The tool was developed under the Open Garments research project, and was supported by European Commission research funds. In 2016 a bridge between Art and Bespoke Fashion was made whereas visual artists upload designs to be printed on shirts.

Bivolino is mostly using fabrics from reliable italian weavers like Monti, Albini, Canclini, Thomas Mason, David & John Anderson. Bivolino's manufacturing standards matches the Luxury Italian make. It has a strong partnership with Tunesian Tailoring Manufacturing companies that guarantees quality and perfect fitting. Bivolino collaborates with 50 italian influencers.

December 2021: Bivolino.com launches first-ever transport carbon footprint calculator for his bespoke shirts.Made to measure shirts produced on demand and delivered by sea and road generate 1.6 kg/CO² emission per shirt, three times lower than mass produced shirts. This study has been conducted by Ecolife.be. Off-the-rack shirts produced in far-east, transported by sea and sold through webshops or stores have 2.7 kg CO² and 4.2 kg CO² footprint, considering an average of 25% returns. ‘Flying-in’ shirts from far-east has an even more negative impact on the environment with a transport carbon footprint of 6.8 kg CO².

== Visual Identity (logo) ==
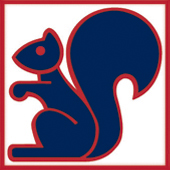
The Bivolino logo used between 1963 and 2005.

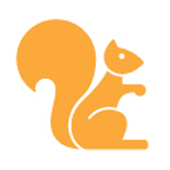
The Bivolino logo developed in 2005.

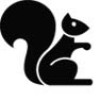
The current Bivolino logo.

== Awards ==
In 2004, Bivolino was given the Starter Award from the Dutch home shopping association, Thuiswinkel.org. In 2006, the company was awarded the BeCommerce Award by the Belgian home shopping association, BeCommerce.

== Leadership ==
Chief executive officers:

- 1954 - 1987: Louis & Jacques Bijvoet
- 1987 - 2024: Michel Bijvoet
- 2024 - 2025: Louis de Cartier
- 2025: Mike Bivolino
