= Dress2kill =

British tailoring company

Dress2kill Ltd
- Type: Limited company
- Industry: Tailoring, retail
- Founded: 1999
- Headquarters: London, England, United Kingdom
- Key people: James Hibbert (Founder and Managing Director), Shirley Biggs (Founder)
- Products: clothing, bespoke suits, made-to-measure suits
- Website: https://dress2kill.com/

Dress2kill Ltd is a tailoring business formed in 1999 by James Hibbert and Shirley Biggs. It sells bespoke suits from its two shops in London and Hampshire, and ships worldwide from its online store. The company had a turnover of £2.15m in 2014.

== History ==
Dress2kill was formed in 1999 by James Hibbert, a former recruitment consultant, and Shirley Biggs, a former buying director. The company uses British cloth for its suits, which are made at its factory in Mumbai, India.

Dress2kill began as a visiting tailoring service, with Hibbert and Biggs each initially inviting 15 friends to try out their bespoke suits. The business was reported to have faced insolvency by the end of 2001, but in 2003, it secured a deal with Virgin Atlantic to provide a tailoring service at the airline's Heathrow Airport business lounge.

In 2005, Dress2kill opened its first shop in Waterloo, London. In May 2019, a second shop was opened in Andover, Hampshire.

In 2012, Dress2kill launched its online business, offering made-to-measure suits.

== Coverage ==
In 2010, Dress2kill was mentioned in three books written by Rachel Bridge, the former Enterprise Editor of The Sunday Times.

In 2006, Dress2kill featured in The Modern Cad Guide by Jaan Larner.
