= Nikolaus Tuczek =

Nikolaus Tuczek was a British shoemaker, based in Mayfair, London, born to a family of Austro-Hungarian immigrants.

Trading as N. Tuczek, he had a shop at 15b Clifford Street, and later at 17 Clifford Street. At one time, they also had premises at 21 Jermyn Street.

Fellow shoemaker George Cleverley started his career with Tuczek in 1920 and worked there for 38 years, before opening his own workshop. In 1970, the company was taken over by John Lobb.

In March 2021, a pair of Winston Churchill's monogrammed velvet slippers handmade by N. Tuczek was sold at auction for nearly £40,000.
