= Aubercy =

- Industry: Shoes Manufacturing and Repair
- Founded: 1935; 90 years ago in Paris
- Founder: André Aubercy; Renée Aubercy
- Headquarters: France

Aubercy is a French family-owned company that produces bespoke shoes, high-end ready-to-wear and a shoe repair service. It was founded in 1935 by André and Renée Aubercy, at the 34 rue Vivienne in Paris.

== History ==
The bootmaker Aubercy was founded in 1935 by André and his wife Renée Aubercy. At first, it only produced high-end ready to wear shoes. The first collections were made in a small workshop in the neighborhood of Buttes-Chaumont. The shoes were designed to match the taste of the high society's member that André Aubercy befriended during the Interwar period, such as Edward VIII, Albert Sarraut and especially the Baron de Redé and Arthuro Lopez. The Baron de Redé and Arthuro Lopez were critical influences on the development of Aubercy's style.

After World War II, Aubercy became famous for providing shoes to socialites such as Paul Meurice, Sacha Guitry and Jacques Charron. The industrialization of cloth-making led Aubercy to create its own atelier in 1956, hiring Italian artisans for their artistic culture but training them to the French approach of durable products.

In 1970, Philippe and Odette Aubercy inherited the company and developed new products, such as a women's line (opening a manufacturing unit in Modène), multiples leather goods products and a made to order service in which client could personalize all the products.

Pursuing and reinforcing the handwork and craft identity of the company, Philippe and Odette's son, Xavier Aubercy, invented numerous high-end ready-to-wear models, opened a bespoke boot-maker workshop in Paris in early 2000 led by Didier Martinez (formerly at Berluti), launched a new collection of belts and luggage, and a luxury shoe repair service. By 2004, Aubercy was making 1.3 million euros in annual revenue.

Denis Sassou Nguesso, President of the Republic of the Congo, was a returning customer of Aubercy.

== Description ==
In 2019, Aubercy is still run by the founder's family and is still independent, administrated by Philippe, Odette and their son, Xavier Aubercy. The company handles many shoe-making processes by hand to preserve the artisan touch and quality.

== Style ==
Aubercy style is French but has some elements of both English and Italian shoe styles. Aubercy's style is characterized by many elements usually only used in bespoke boot-making, such as the chiseled toe, the hand-sewed mid-sole, the doubled seam on the upper and hand cutting and hand-sewing the shoes.

== Award ==
In June 2016, Aubercy earned the label Entreprise du patrimoine vivant.
