= Betsy Lobb =

British businesswoman (1868–1956)

- Born: Betsy Smerdon; 15 November 1868; South Brent
- Died: 9 December 1956 (aged 88); Radlett
- Occupation: Businessperson
- Known for: running John Lobb Bootmaker
- Spouse: William Hunter Lobb
- Children: four sons

Betsy Lobb (15 November 1868 – 9 December 1956) was the British owner and managing director of John Lobb Bootmaker a royal warranted maker of bespoke boots and shoes in London and Paris.

== Life ==
Lobb was born on Forder farm in South Brent in Devon in 1868. Her parents were John and Ellen (born Callard) Smerdon. She worked in a small hotel in London where she was the manager.

She married William Hunter Lobb who trained as a bootmaker. He was the heir and second son of John Lobb. William oversaw the expanding business that his father had started opening a shop in Paris in 1901 and a second unsuccessful premises in Regent Street in 1904. Betsy would run the shoe business after her husband died in 1916. The business was unusual as it had failed to mechanise and shoes were manufactured by hand. The clientele were rich and they enjoyed a royal warrant.

Betsy inherited the business and profits were falling. She appointed a manager and moved to Brighton. Her organisation of the business raised her share capital from £7,500 to £17,000 at the end of the war when she returned to the family home in St John's Wood. She had four sons and three survived to adulthood. The business was not doing well and she took in lodgers to raise money to pay for education or Eric who went to Oxford University.

The business survived the second world war after Eric returned to the business. Her eldest son, "Mr Will", who had trained as bootmaker was drafted into the Ministry of Information. Notably Eric escaped the draft and remained a civilian. The firm's premises was bombed six times and eventually destroyed, but other premises were found nearby. She and her sons, Eric and William, ran the company as equal partners.

Lobb died in 1956 at her home in Radlett.
