= Ascot Chang =

Clothing brand

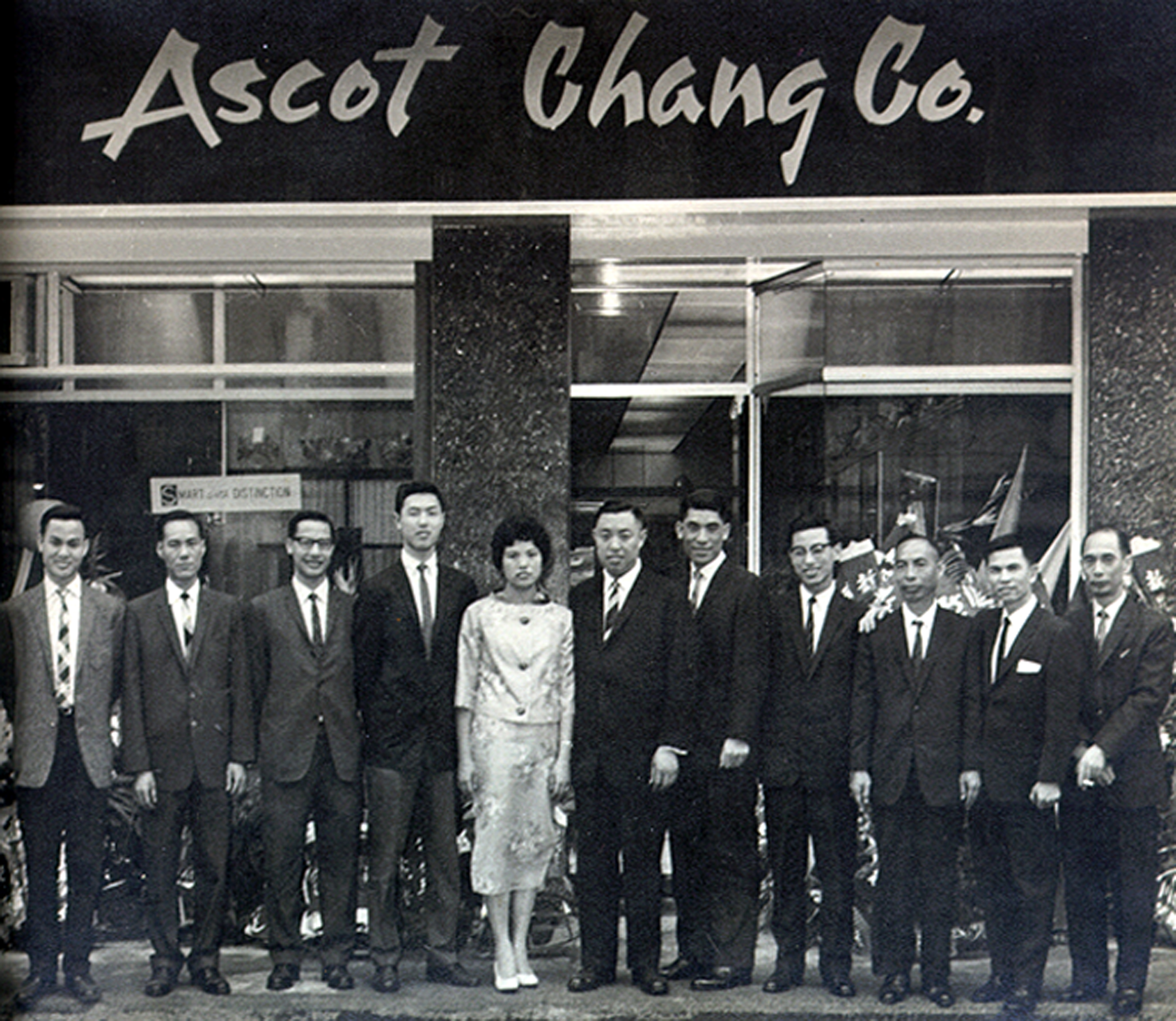
- Industry: Retailer
- Founded: 1953
- Founder: Ascot Chang
- Products: Clothing, Fashion
- Website: www.ascotchang.com

Ascot Chang is a brand of bespoke shirts and suits. Ascot Chang opened his first store on Kimberly Road in Hong Kong in 1953. It now has 15 locations across China, Hong Kong, the United States, and the Philippines. High-profile customers include former president George W. Bush, Leonardo DiCaprio, and Andy Warhol.

== History ==
Ascot Chang left his hometown, Fenghua, at age fourteen to apprentice under a master shirtmaker in Shanghai. In 1949, he left for Hong Kong where he started taking orders for custom made shirts. Knocking on door after door, he visited the offices of Shanghainese businessmen who were unable to find high quality shirts in Hong Kong.

By 1953, Ascot Chang opened his first 600 square feet (56 m^{2}) store at 34 Kimberley Road. He opened his first branch at the Peninsula Hotel in 1963, which is still open to this day.

In 1967, with sales negatively impacted by the Hong Kong 1967 leftist riots, Ascot Chang went on his first trunk show: over three months, he visited twenty cities in the United States, including San Francisco, Boston, and New York City.

When Ascot Chang suffered a heart attack in the 1970s, his son, Tony Chang, and his brother, Johnny Chang, started leading the company. Under the second generation of Changs, Ascot Chang spread worldwide, with their first international store opening in New York in 1986.

Currently, Ascot Chang has 15 locations across China, Hong Kong, the United States, and the Philippines.

== Style ==
The Ascot Chang house cut is a continental style that is characterized by medium shoulder padding, strong yet lightweight canvas structure, and a very slight roped shoulder. The styling leans towards a slim fit that balances aesthetics and comfort for a professional silhouette.
