= Raja Fashions =

Coordinates: 51.5102°N 0.1397°W

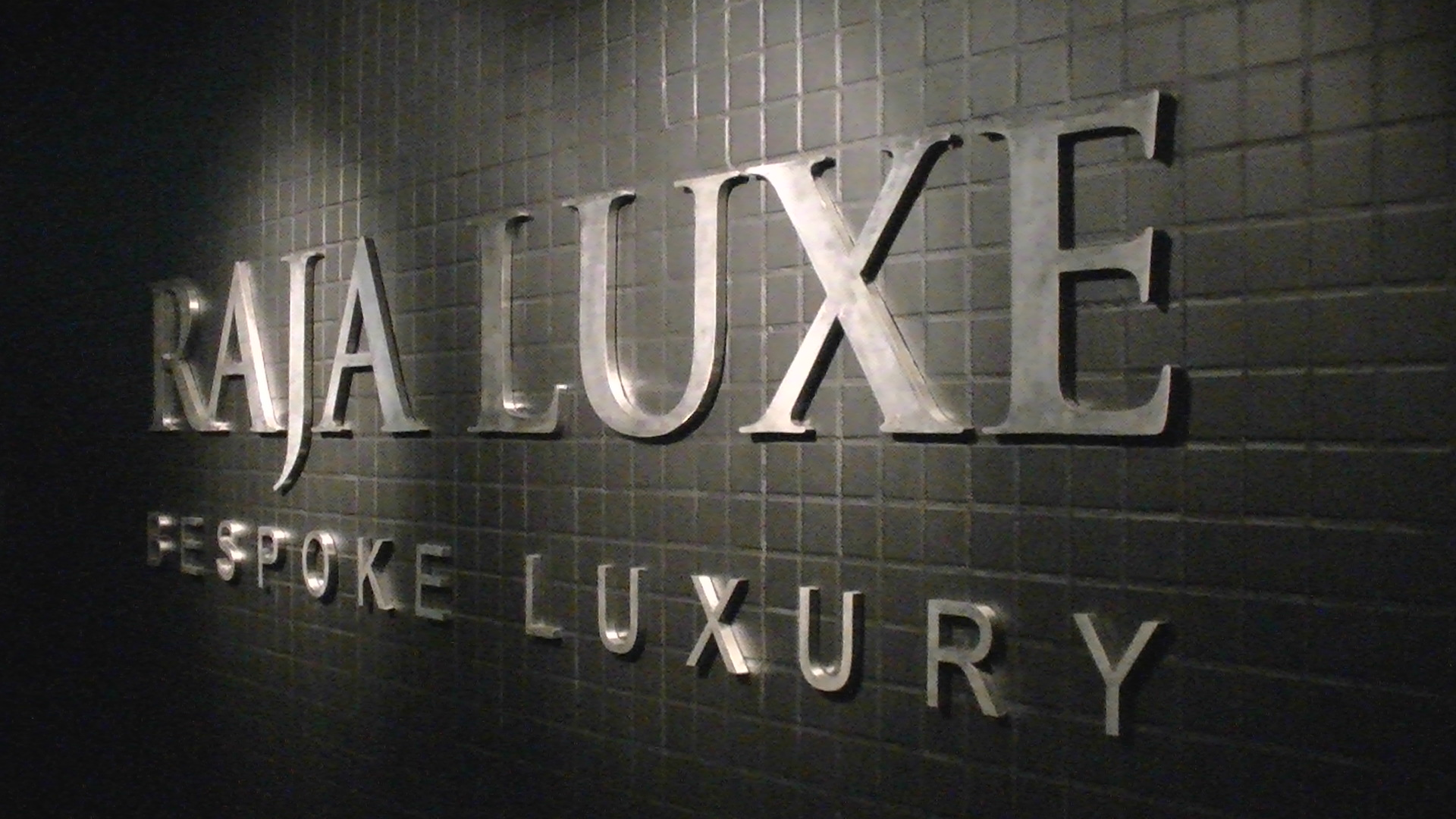
- Type: Private
- Industry: Tailoring
- Founded: 1957
- Founder: Raja Daswani
- Headquarters: Tsim Sha Tsui, Kowloon, Hong Kong
- Area served: U.S., United Kingdom, Canada, Australia, Germany, Hong Kong, New Zealand, Belgium, Switzerland, U.A.E, Qatar
- Key people: Prashant R. Daswani (Owner), Vishal Daswani (Director)
- Products: Clothing, Fashion, Leather Jacket, Suit
- Owner: Mr. Prashant R Daswani
- Number of employees: 500+
- Website: raja-fashions.com

Raja Fashions are a bespoke tailor based in Hong Kong with sales operations in other countries. The company's business model is to take measurement from clients abroad, for instance in Europe and North America, after which clothes are produced by tailors based in China.

Founded in 1957, Raja Fashions started making bespoke garments for men and women from their store in Hong Kong. In response to the 1997 transfer of sovereignty over Hong Kong, during which many of Raja's British expatriate customers returned to Britain, the firm began setting up shop in hotel rooms in different cities across the world.

== History ==
Raja Fashions' was officially established in 1957 by the grandfather of Mr. Raja Daswani, who emigrated from Northern India to Hong Kong and set up a custom tailored business in Kowloon. During the 40-year period between the establishment of Raja Fashions and the handover of Hong Kong back to China, the Raja Fashions store in Kowloon continued to grow in reputation. When Raja Daswani assumed operations, he started promoting the brand "Raja Fashions".

After the handover of Hong Kong, instead of waiting for customers to come to their store in Kowloon, Mr. Daswani decided to visit his customers in United Kingdom, and began setting stores in 5-star hotels in London and letting his previous customers know by mail that he would be coming to measure people for suits.

These international tours proved profitable, so Raja Fashions quickly adapted this strategy for others cities in the United Kingdom and the United States. In 2009, Raja Fashions embarked on a second round of expansion, establishing hotel shops in Australia, Canada, Germany, New Zealand, Belgium, and Switzerland. In 2012, Raja Fashions offered service in Doha for the first time.

== Advertorial text ==
An advertorial commissioned by the company - an advert written in the style of a features article - has become well known in Britain and other English-speaking countries for running unchanged for many years. Jonathan Margolis, the Financial Times journalist who wrote it while freelancing in 2004, has said that he believes the article may be the most printed text in the English language apart from the Bible and the works of Shakespeare, although this has been disputed.
