= Bespoked =

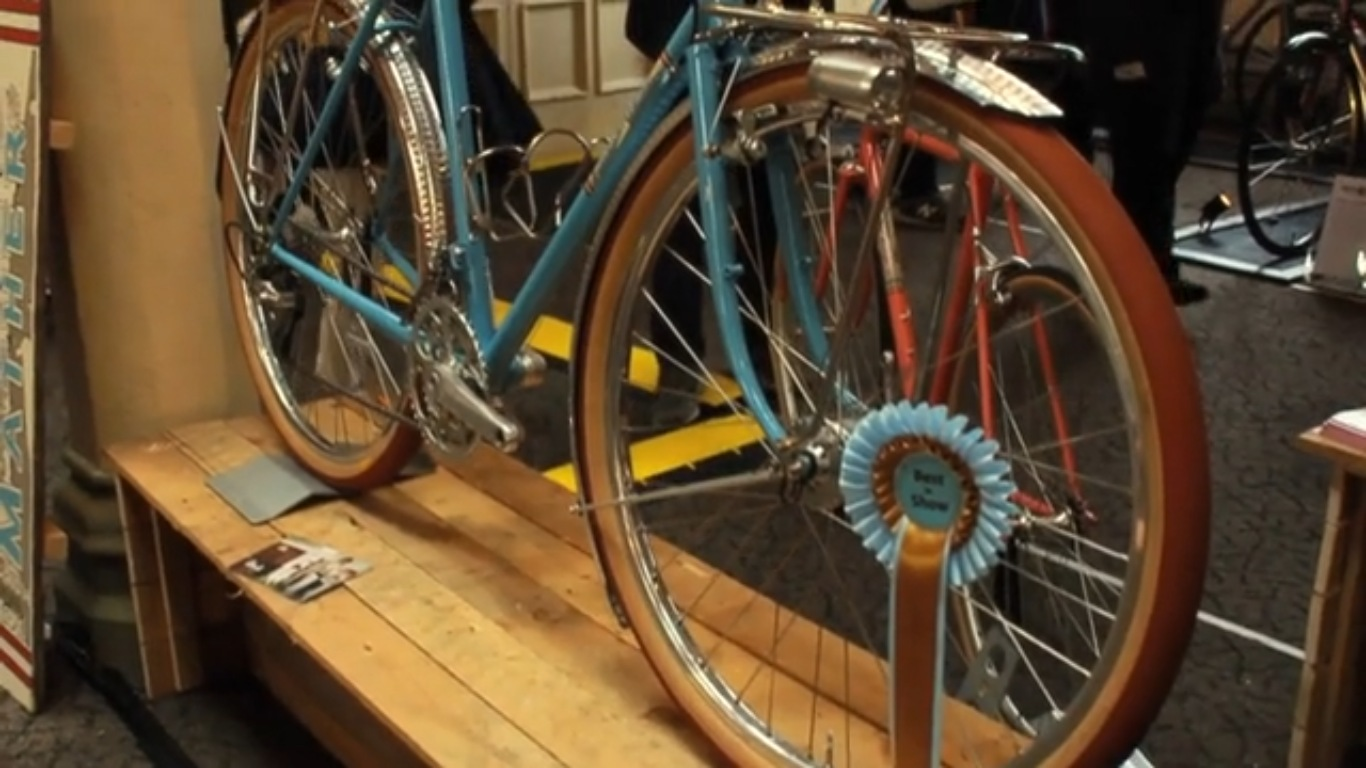
A bicycle with a winning rosette at the 2012 Bespoked event

BESPOKED is a bicycle show for custom bikes based in London. It features framebuilders from around the world, and seeks to promote the art of building bicycles by hand.

== History ==
The creators and directors, Phil and Tessa Taylor, originate from a frame building and event organising background, having previously organised the Brighton Art Fair. In 2022 the show was taken over by Petor Georgallou and Josh Bullock. They have since expanded the show to have a second Central European location in Dresden Germany.

BESPOKED held the country's first bespoke bicycle show at the Paintworks, Bristol in June 2011. 40 exhibitors including names such as Condor Cycles, Brian Rourke Cycles and Enigma Titanium were represented, as well as newcomers like Feather cycles from Leeds and Donhou from Norwich.

== Awards given ==
The award winners were as follows:

=== 2011 ===
- The Reynolds Best of Show - Donhou Cycles 'Donhou Town Bike'
- The Reynolds Best Road Bike - Tokyo Fixed 'Cherubim '
- The Brooks Best Track Bike - Feather Cycles 'Martin's 40th'
- The Brooks Best Off Road - Enigma 'Custom 29er'
- The Brooks Best Utility - Lee Cooper Custom Frames 'Chromed Porteur' - Alex Hatfield Concepts 'John West Custom Paint'
- The Brooks Public Vote - 1st Place - Demon Frameworks - 2nd Place - Brian Rourke - 3rd Place - Feather Cycles.

=== 2012 ===
In 2012 the show moved to a bigger venue at Brunel's Old Station, located in the historic railway terminus building of the Great Western Railway next to Bristol's Temple Meads railway station. 78 exhibitors displayed all types of bike in a range of materials from carbon to wood. UK framebuilders were joined by overseas counterparts and a ‘New Builder’ area was launched. This show also saw the launch of Rapha's UK Continental, featuring six UK framebuilders. Four of these bikes were on display at the show. The 2012 award winners were:

- Best of Show - Robin Mather 'Camponneur'
- Best Road Bicycle - Ricky Feather 'Rapha'
- Best Track Bicycle - Demon Frameworks 'Hermes'
- Best Off Road - Crisp Titanium 'Il Capo'
- Best Touring/Randonneur - Roberts 'Rough Stuff'/ Winter Bicycles 'Wanderer'
- Best New Builder - Wilkinson Cycles 'Mixed Gear'
- Best Utility Bicycle - Mercian Cycles 'Jane's Bike'
- Spirit of Cycling Award - Tim March - TubalCain
- The Public Vote sponsored by Brooks England - 1st Robin Mather - 2nd Donhou Bicycles - 3rd Feather Cycles

=== 2013 ===
Bespoked Bristol 2013 took place in the same venue the weekend of 12 – 14 April. Over 6000 people attended to see the bicycles and talk to makers from around the world. Shinichi Konno of Cherubim from Japan, Marco Bertoletti of Legend from Italy, Eric Estlund of Winter Bicycles and Paul Price of Paul Components from the USA joined the UK framebuilders. The 2013 award winners were:

- Best in Show - Feather Cycles
- Best Touring - Oak Cycles
- Best Road Bike - Swallow Bespoke
- Best Track - Winter Bicycles
- Best Utility - Saffron Frameworks
- Best Off Road - Shand Cycles
- Best New Builder - Woodelo
- Most innovative Product/Design - Titchmarsh Cycles
- Spirit of Cycling - The Bicycle Academy
- Public Vote - 1st Feather Cycles - Joint 2nd Donhou Bicycles & Field Cycles
- Winners of the Peer Award - Joint Winners - Paulus Quiros & Ted James Designs

The event's success represents the resurgence of interest in handmade bikes in the UK.

=== 2014 ===
Bespoked 2014 moved to a new venue at the Lee Valley Velopark - home of the track cycling, BMX and Paralympic track cycling during the London 2012 Olympic games. Over 120 exhibitors attended representing a broad cross-section of the handmade bicycle industry including international builders from the US, Czech Republic, Australia, the Netherlands and France.

The 2014 award winners were:

- Best In Show - Saffron Frameworks
- Best Road Bicycle - Baum (Prestige Cycles)
- Best Off Road Bicycle - Titchmarsh Cycles
- Best Touring/Randonneur - Sven Cycles
- Best Track Bicycle - Winter Bicycles
- Best New Frame Builder - Swarf Cycles
- Best Utility Bicycle - Donhou Bicycles
- Steve Worland Innovation Award - Talbot Frameworks
- Spirit of Cycling - Moss Bikes
- Best Alternative Material (non-steel) - Woodelo
- Public Vote – Woodelo

=== 2015 ===
The 2015 festival was announced as returning to Bristol in April that year.
