= Bespoke =

Made to order, usually one-of-kind

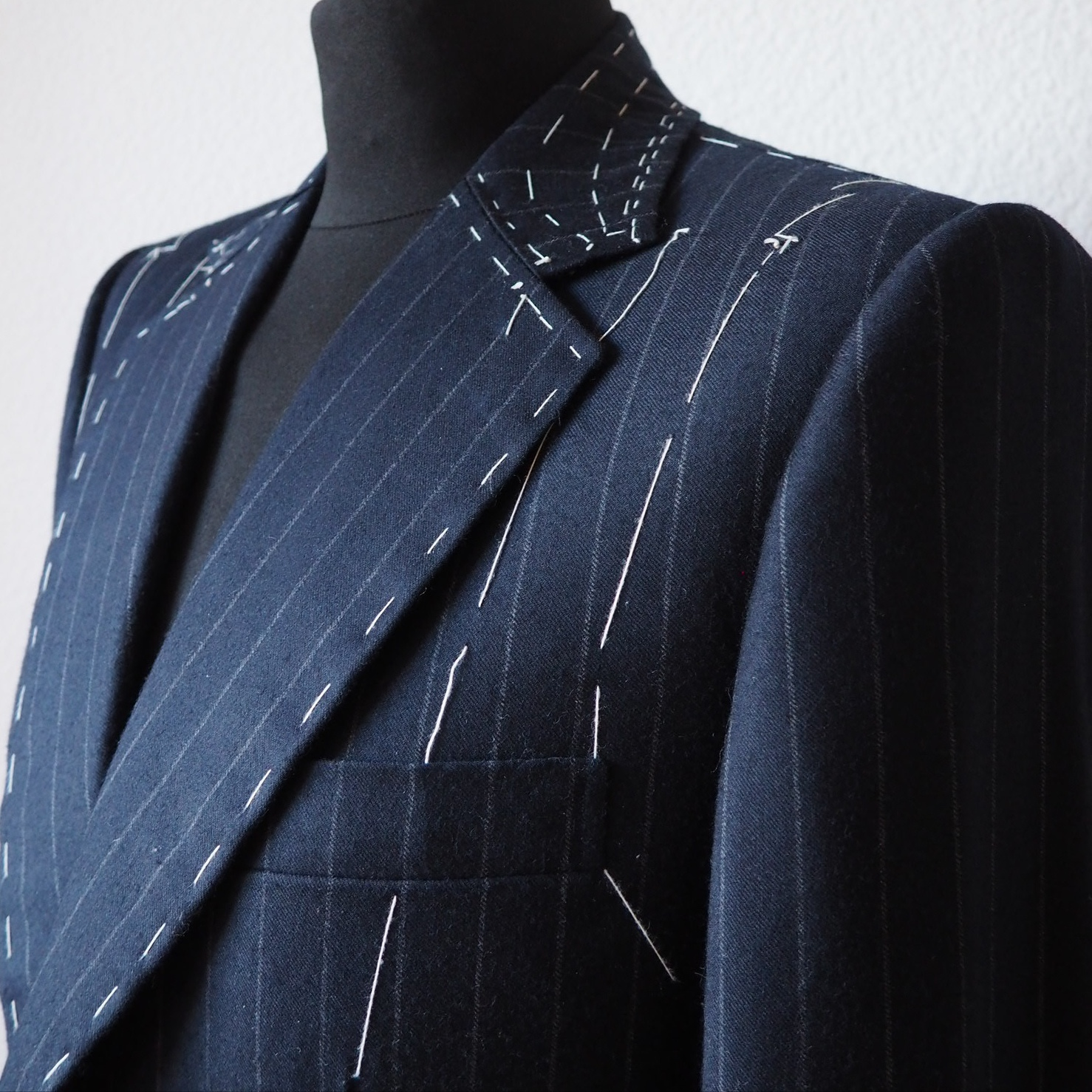
A bespoke tailoring "coat" (suit jacket) under construction

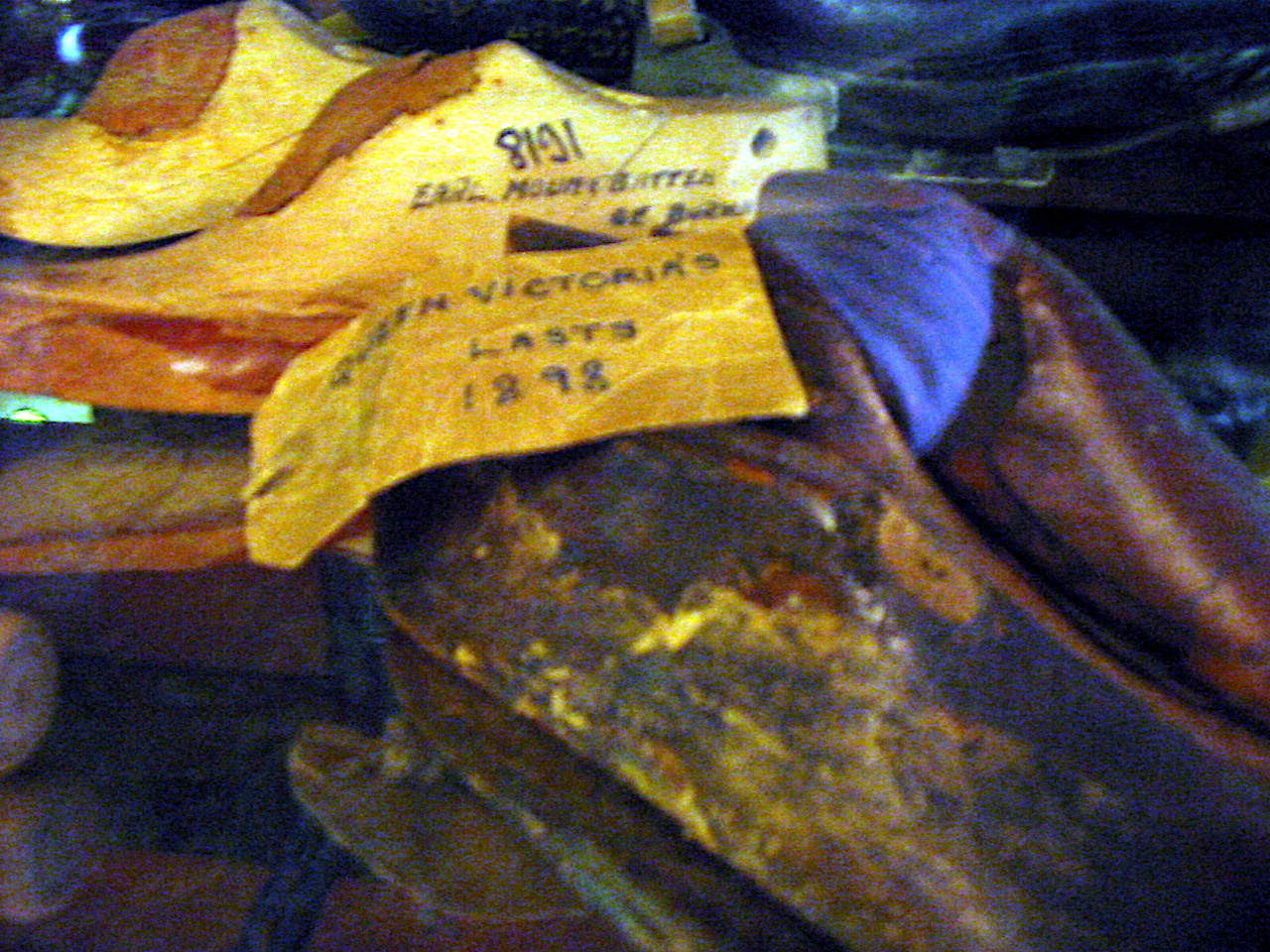
The bespoke shoe lasts of Queen Victoria from 1898 and Earl Mountbatten of Burma at John Lobb Bootmaker in London

Bespoke (/biˈspoʊk/) describes any item commissioned to a particular specification, altered or tailored to the customs, tastes, or usage of an individual purchaser. In contemporary usage, "bespoke" has become a general marketing and branding concept implying exclusivity and limited runs.

== Origin ==
Bespoke is derived from the verb "bespeak", meaning to "speak for something". The particular meaning of the verb form is first cited from 1583 and given in the Oxford English Dictionary: "to speak for, to arrange for, engage beforehand: to 'order' (goods)". The adjective "bespoken" means "ordered, commissioned, arranged for" and is first cited from 1607. Originally, the adjective "bespoke" described tailor-made suits and shoes.

According to Collins English Dictionary, the term was generally British English in 2008. American English more commonly uses the word "custom", instead, as in "custom-made", "custom car", or "custom motorcycle". Nevertheless, bespoke has increased in usage in American English during the 21st century.

== History ==
The word "bespoke" is most known for its "centuries-old relationship" with tailor-made suits, but the Oxford English Dictionary also ties the word to shoemaking in the mid-1800s. Although it is now used as an adjective, it was originally used as the past participle of bespeak. According to a spokesperson for Collins English Dictionary, it later came to mean "to discuss", and then to the adjective describing something that was "discussed in advance", which is how it came to be associated with tailor-made apparel. The word was used as an adjective in A Narrative of the Life of Mrs. Charlotte Charke, the 1755 autobiography of actress Charlotte Charke, which refers to The Beaux' Stratagem as "a bespoke play". After that, the adjective was generally associated with men's tailor-made suits.

Before about the 19th century, most clothing was made to measure, or bespoke, whether made by professional tailors or dressmakers, or as often, at home. The same applied to many other types of goods. With the advent of industrialised ready-to-wear clothing, bespoke became largely restricted to the top end of the market and is now normally considerably more expensive, at least in developed countries.

At some point after that, the word "bespoke" came to be applied to more than tailoring, although exactly when is unclear. Mark-Evan Blackman of the Fashion Institute of Technology in New York City told The Wall Street Journal in 2012 that the "bespoke proliferation may be tied to young Hollywood types becoming enamored with custom suits about a decade ago". The Wall Street Journal article said that "language purists" were not happy, while suitmakers said the word had been "bastardized".

== Contemporary usage ==
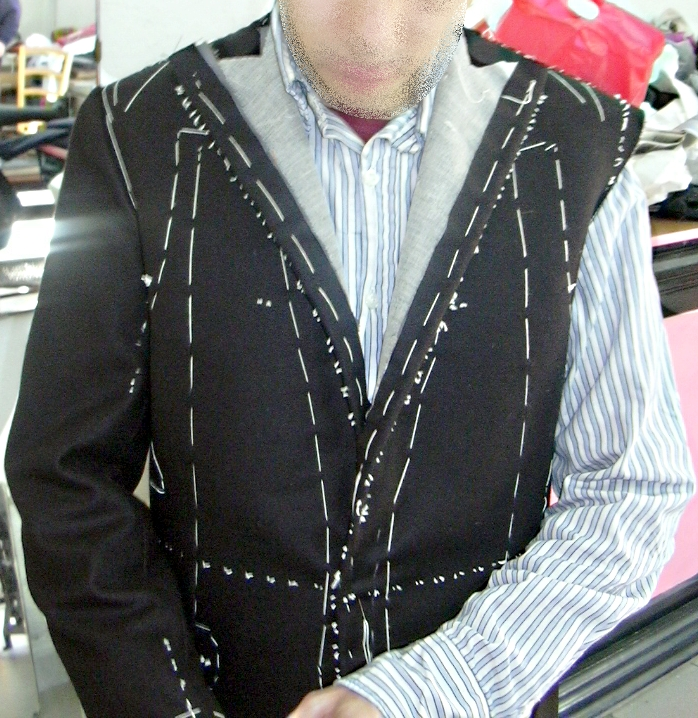
Fitting of a bespoke jacket

In 1990, the American writer William Safire questioned in a New York Times article what had become of "custom, a word fading from our fashion vocabulary in a blizzard of British usage". In a play on words, he wrote of the snob appeal of the word: "To be suitably trendy, bespeak to me of bespoke tailoring." Gentlemen's Quarterly magazine wrote that the word was "gaining in popularity", meaning "the opposite of off-the-rack". In its contemporary usage, it implies exclusivity, and is used as an aid in marketing and branding. A 2014 India Today article described bespoke as an emerging branding trend that marketers would need to embrace.

A 2001 google search of "bespoke and software" produced 50,000 hits, many not in the UK or the US. The New York Times quoted an Indian technical director as saying the "global communications boom" contributed to a "superset of English vocabulary"; another business writer explained that software companies in India were accustomed to adapting their language depending on the client, so that switching between "bespoke software" and "custom software" was the equivalent of switching between lift and elevator or queue and line. By 2008, the term was more often used to describe software, databases, and computer applications than suits, shirts, or shoes.

The BBC News Magazine wrote in 2008 that the word had increasingly been used to describe things other than websites, suits, and shoes, such as cars, and furniture. Some examples of usage of the word are:

- bespoke medicine (a movement to improve appropriate treatment according to individual patients' requirements),
- bespoke portfolio (an investment tool),
- bespoke shoes (shoes that are made to fit the customer's specifications),
- bespoke software (software written to the specific requirement of a customer), and
- bespoke tailoring (clothing made to the individual measurements of the customer).

Deborah Tannen, a Georgetown University linguistics professor, told The New York Times that "Americans associate it with the British upper class", adding that the word for Americans tapped into "our individualism. We want everything made specially for us. Even when it comes to salad bars." As of 2012, 39 applications used the term "bespoke" at the U.S. Patent and Trademark Office, with half of those having been filed only in the previous 18 months. The Wall Street Journal said that the term had started to proliferate in corporations and among investors a few years before that. A writer in The Independent said that consumers no longer wanted to "keep up with the Joneses", but wanted to set themselves apart, saying that the bespoke drive was antitradition, and about a desire to be different rather than identify collectively with others.

Newsweek described the word as "monstrously distorted, abused, and otherwise mangled into near meaninglessness", saying that anything can now be labeled "bespoke". The same Newsweek writer used the word as a verb to describe ordering a custom-made pair of glasses ("bespeaking a pair of spectacles"). One French bespoke shirtmaker was said to offer 400 shades of white, to satisfy vendor-customer relationships and desire for custom-made items. The New York Times devoted an article to bespoke cocktails, which they described as "something devised on the spot to a customer's precise and sometimes peculiar specifications". In another article, The New York Times described bespoke perfumes' taking the "world of personalization to an entirely new level".

A 2016 article in The New York Times describes a satirical video about bespoke water and observed:

"The B word has become an increasingly common branding lure employed by interior design companies, publishers, surgeons, and pornographers. There are bespoke wines, bespoke software, bespoke vacations, bespoke barber shops, bespoke insurance plans, bespoke yoga, bespoke tattoos, [and] even bespoke medical implants."

A 2022 Saveur Magazine article described the humble guacamole as "...bespoke: Diners could make their guac mild, medium, or hot".

== UK tailoring controversy ==
The UK Savile Row Bespoke Association has requirements for a garment to use the term "bespoke", but those requirements are not followed by some manufacturers. In 2008, the British Advertising Standards Agency allowed a company, Sartoriani, to use "bespoke" to describe its suits, causing a controversy with the Savile Row tailors who use the word to describe custom handmade suits.

== Related terms ==
- Antonyms include "off-the-shelf" and "ready-to-wear"
- Related term: "modding", a DIY slang term meaning personalization of an item after manufacture
- Synonyms include "custom-made" and "made to order"

== See also ==
- Bespoke shoes
- Bespoke tailoring
- Custom-fit
- Mass customization
- Haute couture
