= John Lobb =

Maker of bespoke boots and shoes

John Lobb (27 December 1829 – 17 January 1895) was an English shoemaker and the founder of the companies John Lobb Bootmaker and John Lobb Limited. He founded his first successful company making boots for gold diggers in Australia.

== Early life ==
John Lobb was born in Tywardreath, near Fowey, Cornwall, on 27 December 1829. Unable to follow his father's farmwork occupation after an accident left him with a lifelong limp, John served a five-year apprenticeship with a local shoemaker. Seeking a greater stage for his skills, he walked the almost 250 miles (400 km) to St James's in London, in a stout pair of boots of his own making, only to be ejected from the premises of the best-known society bootmaker, when he demanded to see the proprietor, Mr Thomas.

== Sydney ==
The talk of London at the time was of the Australian gold strikes, so Lobb booked the first available passage to Sydney, Colony of New South Wales. His initial success was in the importation of men's and women's shoes and boots, particularly women's footwear. Together with his lead bootmaker, William Cassull, Lobb cemented his reputation as one of the Colony's top bootmakers. True to the maxim that those who supply gold miners make more money than the miners themselves, as the only shoemaker amongst the prospectors, Lobb prospered making sturdy boots with secret compartments for gold particles in the hollow heels and with his earnings he opened his first store in Sydney in 1854, which also flourished.

In 1857 he married Caroline Victoria, daughter of Thomas Richards, the Sydney harbourmaster and she gave birth to three children in Sydney, John, born in 1858, Caroline Victoria in 1859 and Mary Aline in 1861. Lobb's first apprentice, in 1863, was his wife's younger brother, Frederick Moses Richards (c.1849–1907), who later became the mainstay of the firm.

In 1862, John Lobb, in collaboration with local tanner Alderson & Sons, and with Cassull as lead bootmaker, produced a pair of polished leather riding boots that won the Prize Medal at the 1862 International Exhibition. He followed this coup by speculatively making a fine pair of riding boots for the Prince of Wales which he had delivered with a request to be appointed bootmaker to the prince. This bold approach was successful and a royal warrant was issued on 12 October 1863, whereupon he sold his Sydney shop, took passage to England with his apprentice Frederick, temporarily leaving his wife and children in Sydney.

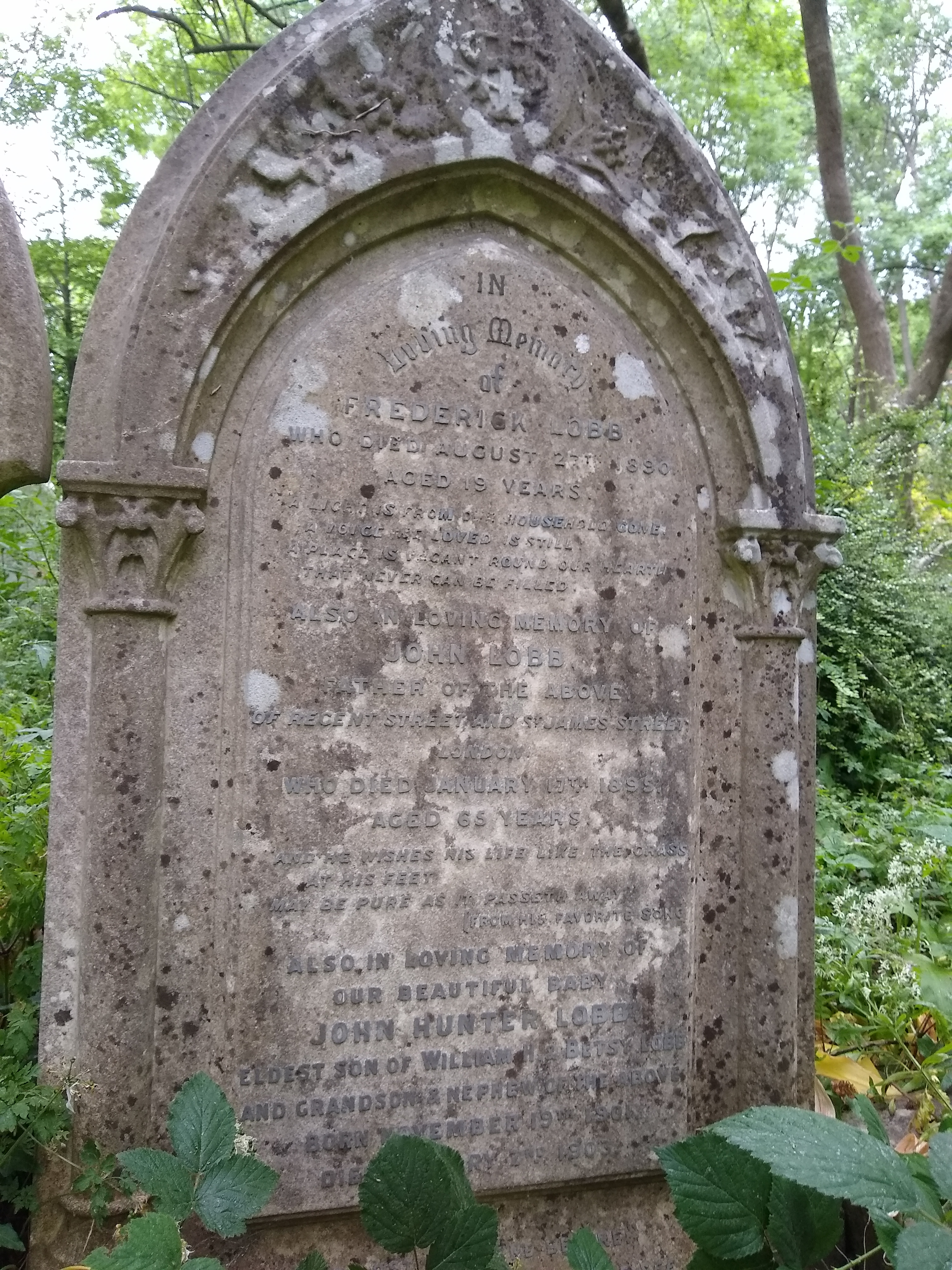
Family grave of John Lobb in Highgate Cemetery (East side)

== London ==
Following the opening of his London premises at 296 Regent Street in 1866, his family joined him and three more children were born, William Hunter Lobb in 1870, Frederick Lobb in 1871, and a daughter who died in infancy. However his wife subsequently left him and moved to Paris where she died. Lobb gained a reputation as a man about town and bon viveur, returning often to his Cornish village and becoming a local philanthropist. The business prospered, winning medals at international exhibitions and opening a second shop, at 29 St James's Street, near that of Thomas, from which he had been ejected so many years before.

== Children ==
John Lobb junior was banished from the family by his father for dishonesty, married a chorus girl and retired to Margate, where he was discreetly supported by his brother. In later years he and his wife were much loved and visited by the Lobb children. William Hunter Lobb (1870–1916) trained as a bootmaker, oversaw the expanding business, opening a shop in Paris in 1901 and a second unsuccessful premises in Regent Street in 1904. He married Betsy Smerdon (1868–1956), the daughter of a Devon farmer. Betsy would run the shoe business after 1916.

== Later life ==
John Lobb died at 296 Regent Street, still firmly in command of his business, on 17 January 1895. He is buried at Highgate Cemetery (east side).
