= John Lobb Bootmaker =

British shoemaker

Coordinates: 51°30′21″N 0°8′18.3″W

John Lobb Limited
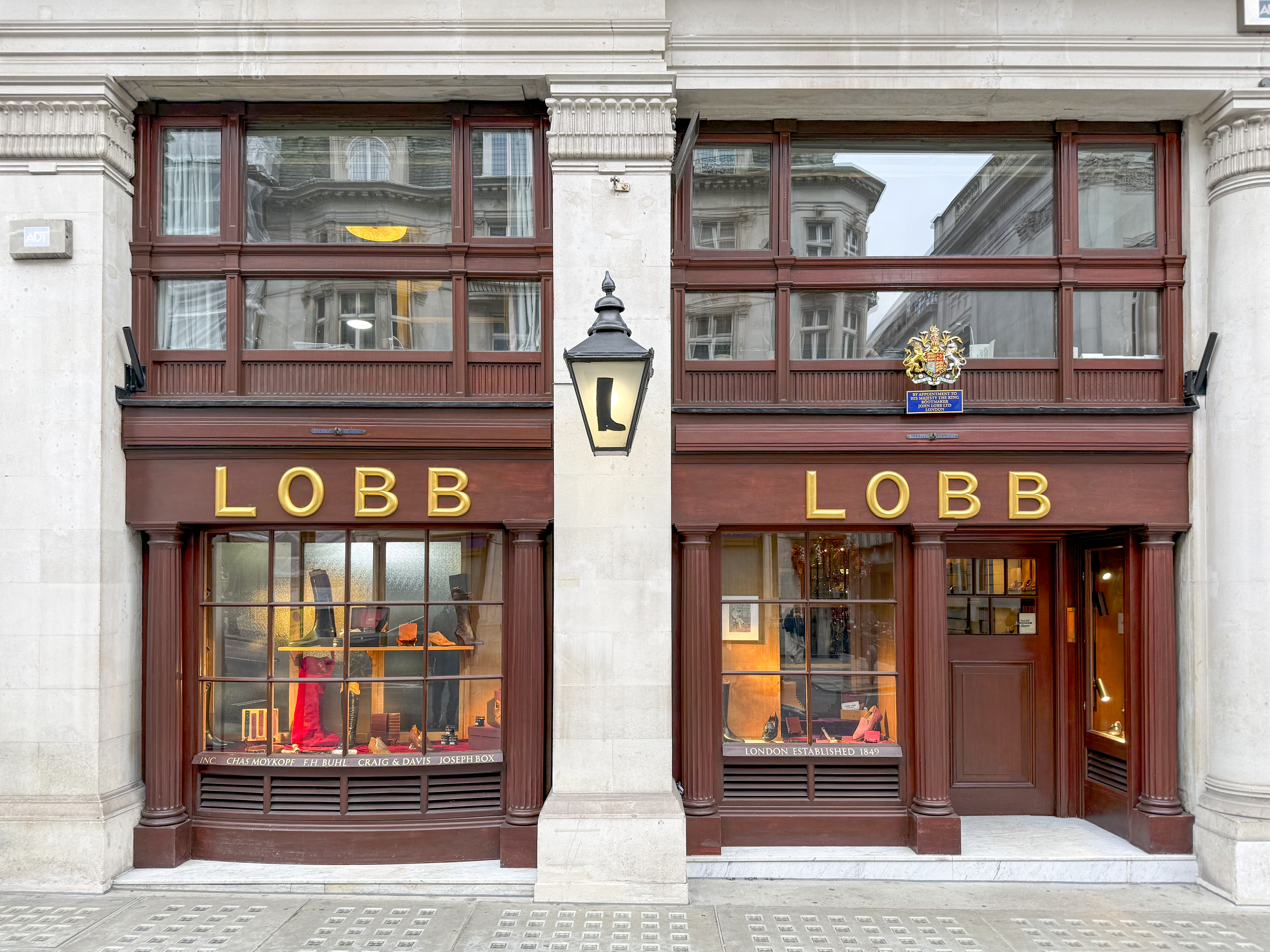
- John Lobb storefront in 2026
- Type: Private limited company
- Industry: Shoemaking
- Founded: 1849 (as a bootmaker); 1866 (London shop opened)
- Founder: John Lobb
- Headquarters: 9 St James's Street, London, United Kingdom
- Products: Bespoke shoes, boots and accessories
- Owner: Lobb family
- Website: johnlobb1849.com

John Lobb Bootmaker is a business that manufactures and retails a luxury brand of shoes and boots, mainly for men but also for women. Leather goods such as wallets and belts are also available. Founded in 1849 by John Lobb (1829–1895), the business has been in operation since 1866 in London and circa 1900 in Paris. John Lobb's son William took over the business, and after he died in 1916, the firm was led by Betsy Lobb.

The original London bespoke workshop at 9 St James's Street remains family-owned and continues to operate independently (as John Lobb Limited). In 1976, the French branch of the business was acquired by the Hermès Group, which has developed the John Lobb ready-to-wear shoe brand around the world. The two companies continue to maintain their bespoke shoe-making tradition, with the Lobb family's workshop in London and the Hermès-owned workshop in Paris.

== History ==
John Lobb opened his first store in Sydney, Australia, in 1854. Lobb's initial success was in the importation of men's and women's shoes and boots, particularly women's footwear. Together with his lead bootmaker, William Cassull, John Lobb cemented his reputation as one of the Colony's top bootmakers. In 1862, John Lobb, in collaboration with local tanner Alderson & Sons, and with Cassull as lead bootmaker, produced a pair of polished leather riding boots that won the Prize Medal at the 1862 International Exhibition.

In 1866, John Lobb opened a shop in London and produced footwear for European royalty. He died in 1895, and his son William took over the business. Unusually, the firm did not mechanise like its competitors but stuck to craft techniques. Following the success of the London shop, William opened a shop in Paris in 1901 and another (unprofitable) shop in Regent Street, London, in 1904.

In 1901, William Lobb married Betsy Smerdon, and after the wedding, they went on a grand tour. William died in 1916, and it was Betsy who saved the business.

In 1976, Hermès was allowed to use the "John Lobb" brand name. Only about 100 pairs of ready-to-wear shoes are finished per day. The original, family-owned John Lobb firm still produces handmade shoes, one pair at a time. Until the 1980s, the business operated only custom-made activity in London and in Paris. From 1982 onwards, the ready-to-wear activity has complemented the made-to-measure, and distribution has expanded.

The London company was the subject of a 1945 British Pathé film, Shoes for the Famous, and an episode of the June 2016 BBC Four documentary series, Handmade: By Royal Appointment.

== Present operations ==
The London bespoke workshop, John Lobb Limited, remains at 9 St James's Street and is still independently operating as a family business. The price of a pair of bespoke shoes typically starts at around $6500. Each pair is custom made for customers, with measurements taken of a customers feet, then wooden lasts made based on the measurements and the shoes constructed around them. The companies customers include the British Royal family, dating back to Queen Victoria, and Hollywood celebrities, such as Frank Sinatra, Duke Ellington and Laurence Olivier.

In 1976, John Lobb Paris became part of the Hermès Group. The ready-to-wear collection debuted in 1982, and the first store showcasing the line opened in 1990 in Paris. In June 2014, the Hermès Group announced the appointment of Paula Gerbase as John Lobb's first ever Artistic Director.

== Gallery ==
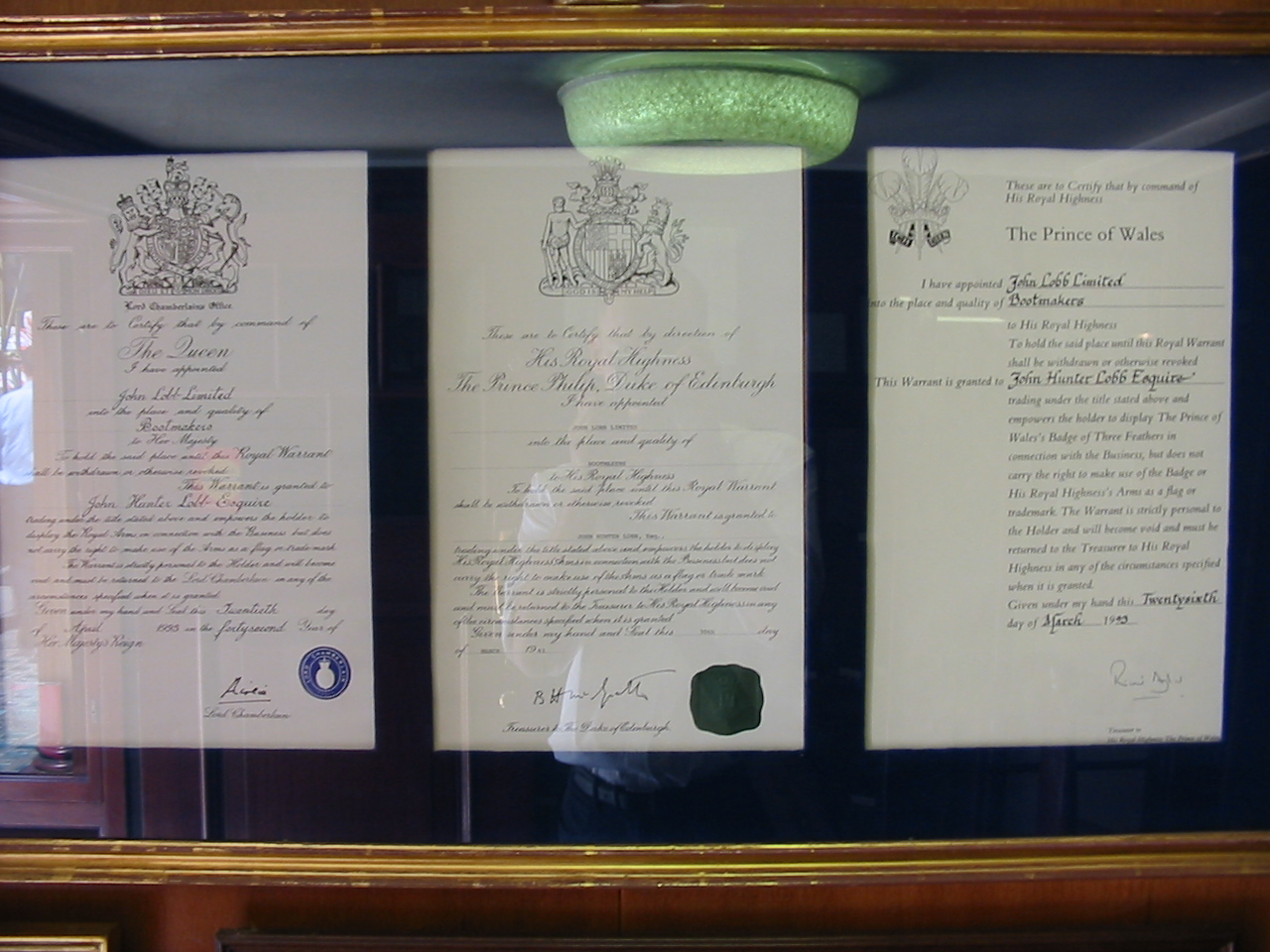
Royal Warrants of John Lobb, bespoke shoe and bootmaker, London

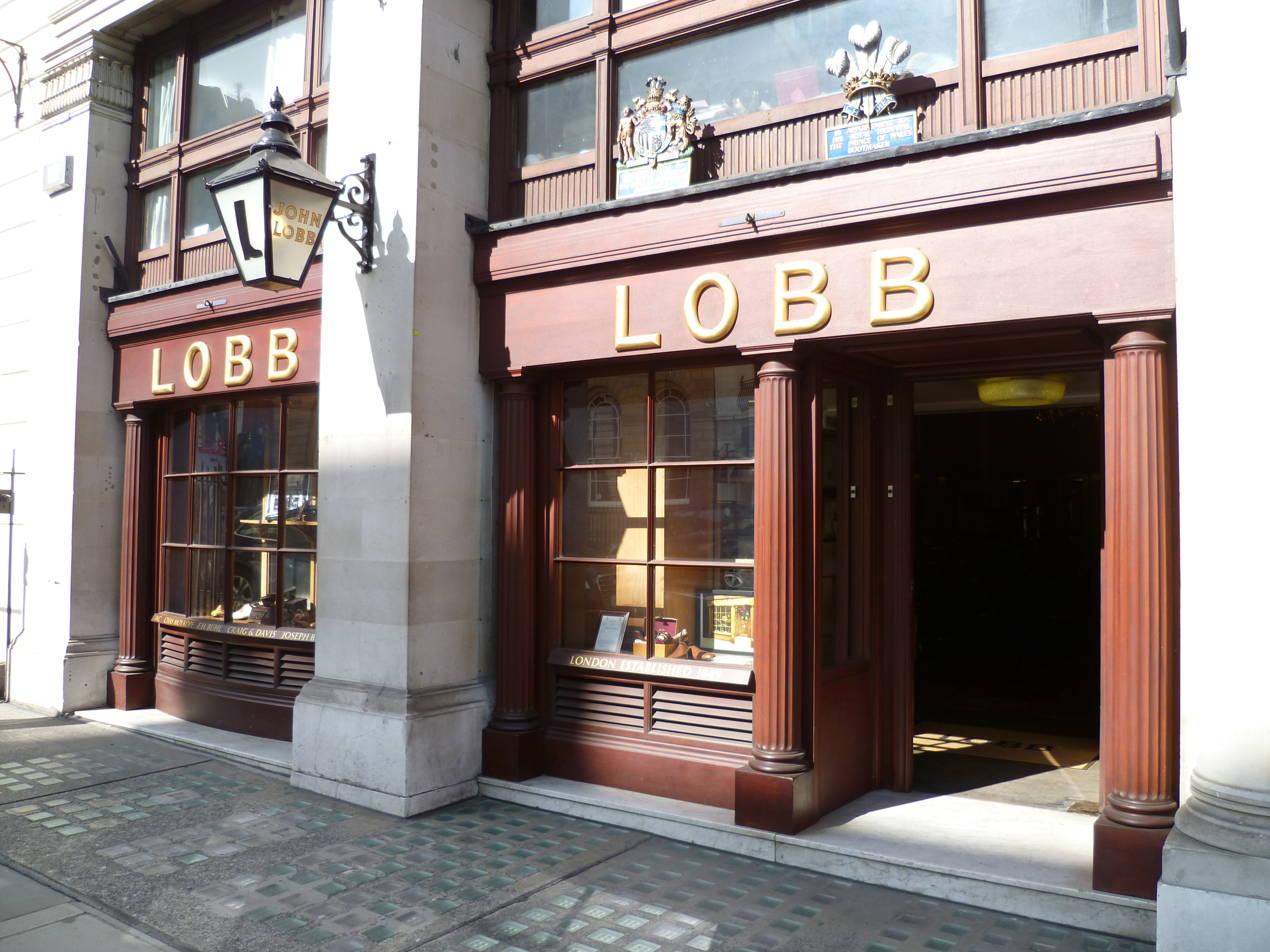
Storefront and workplace of John Lobb, London

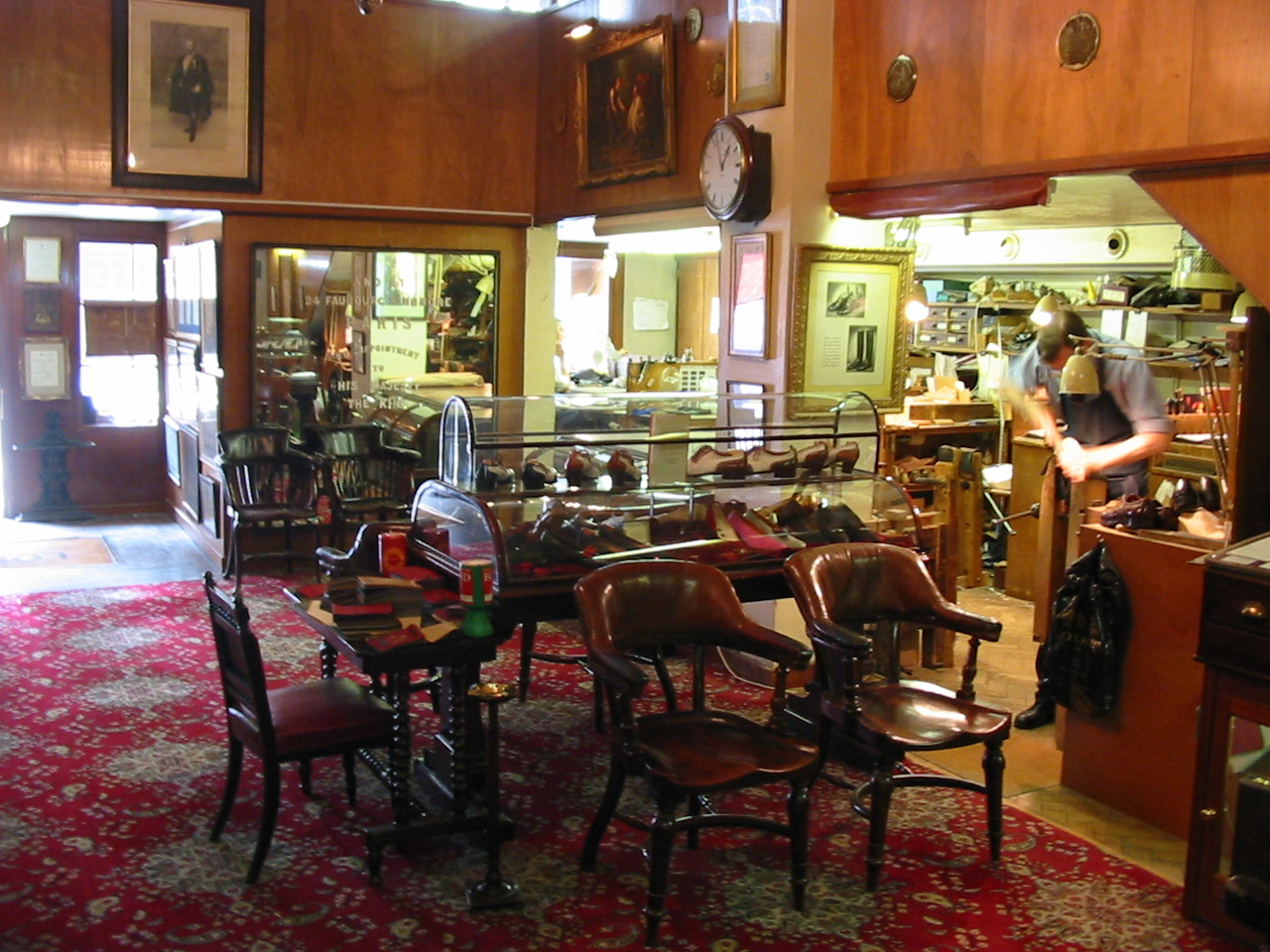
Shop interior of John Lobb, London

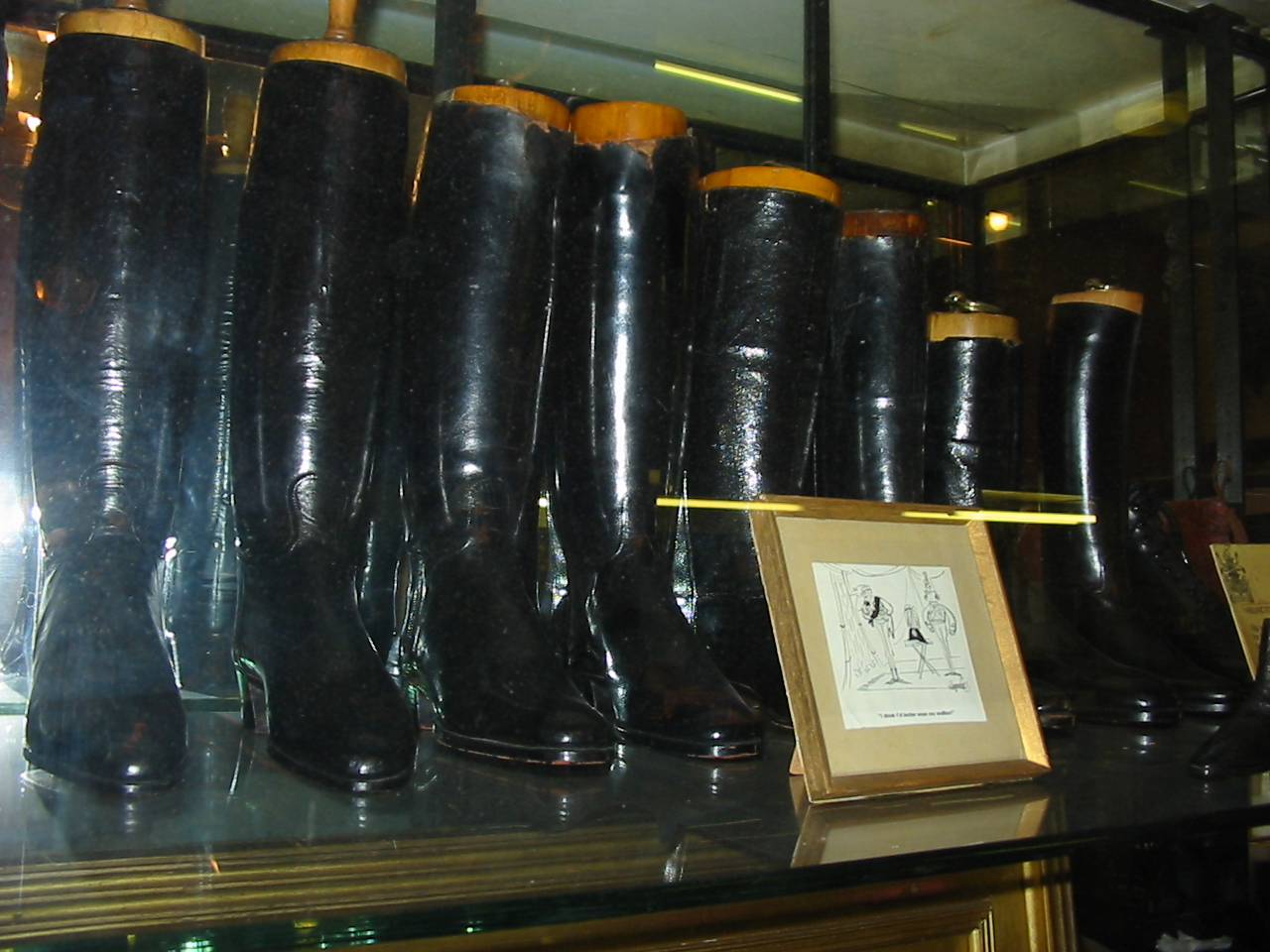
Boots from John Lobb, London

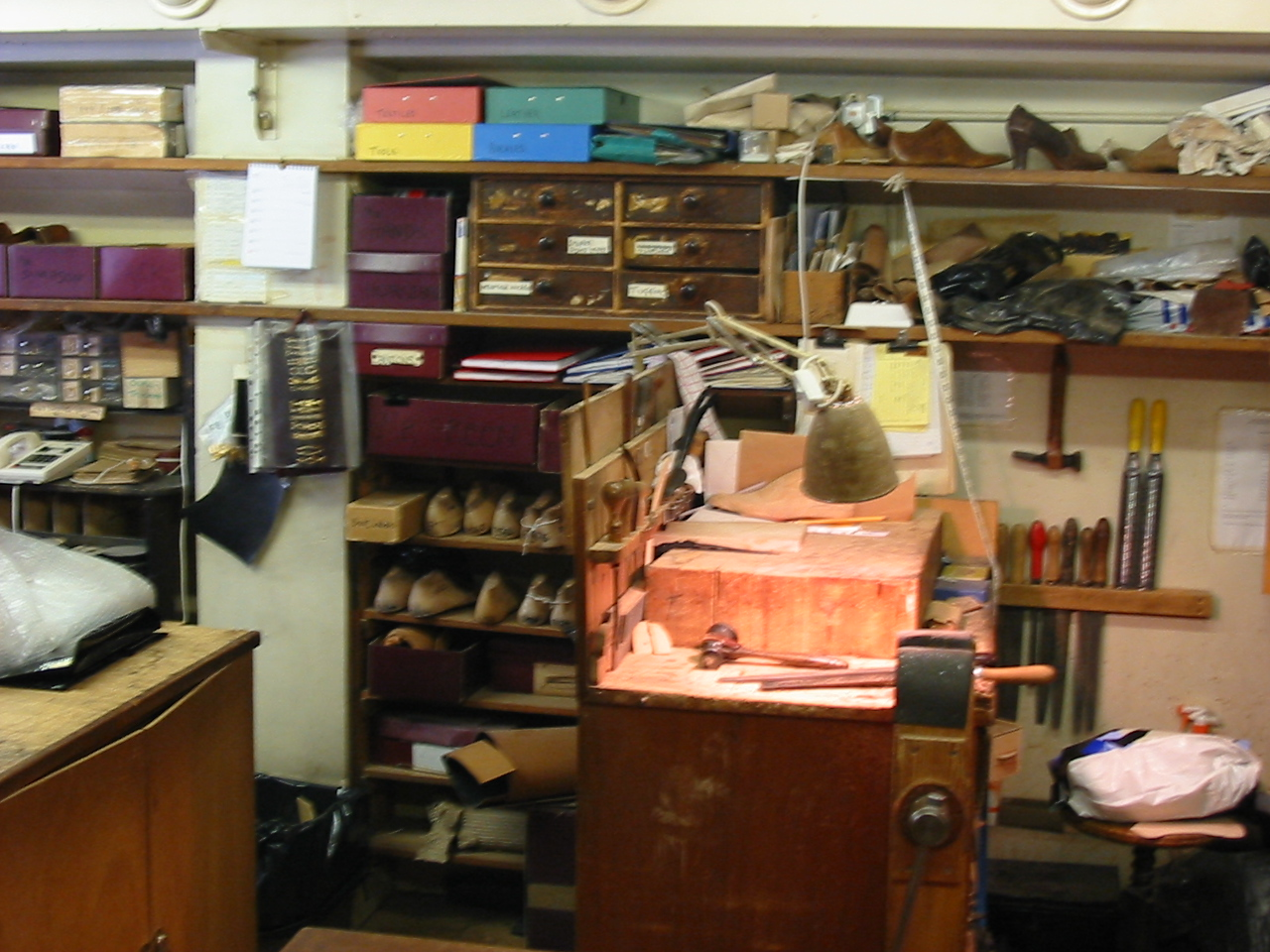
Workplace of John Lobb, London

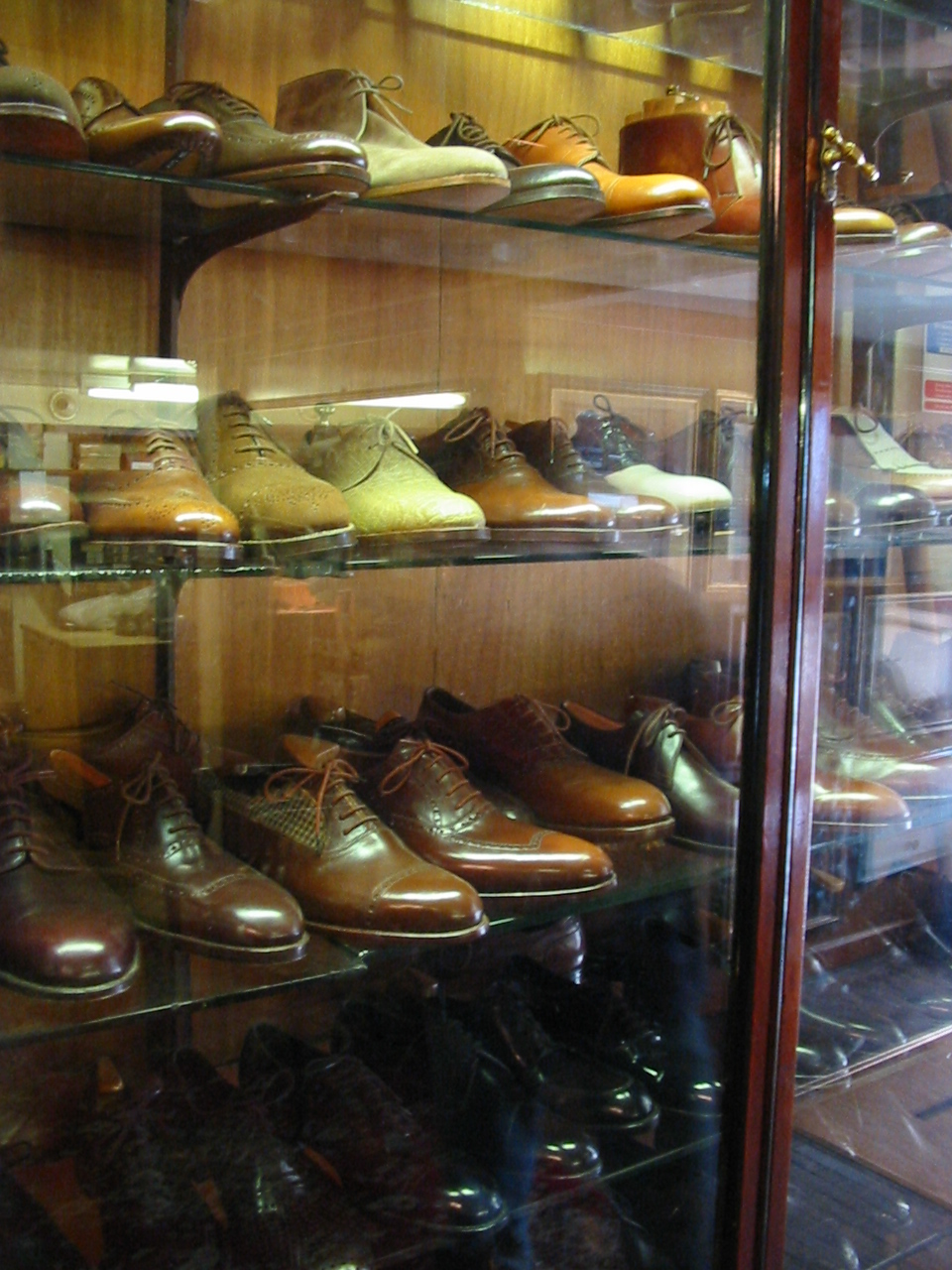
Display of shoes at John Lobb, London

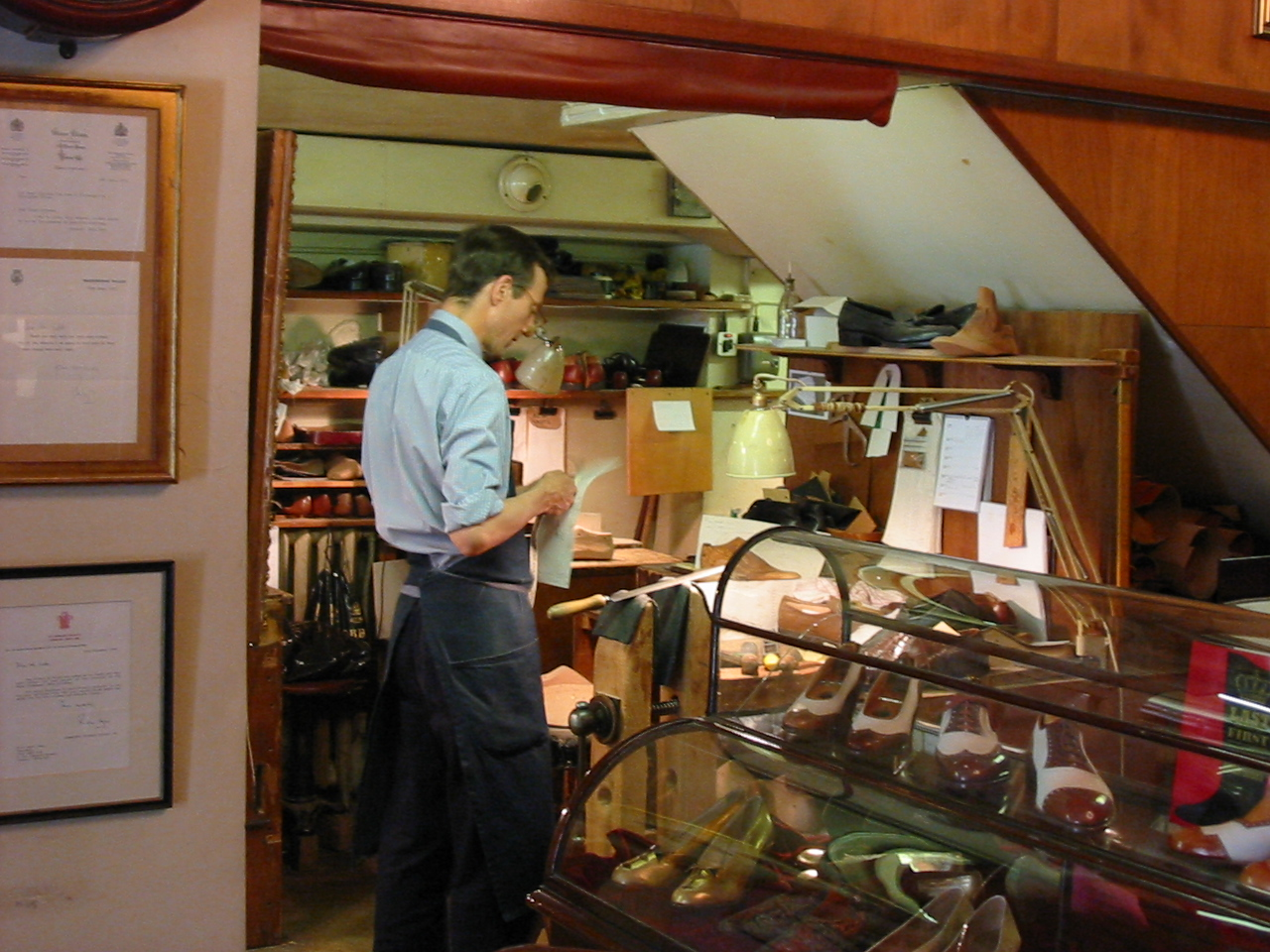
Shoemaker at work, John Lobb, London

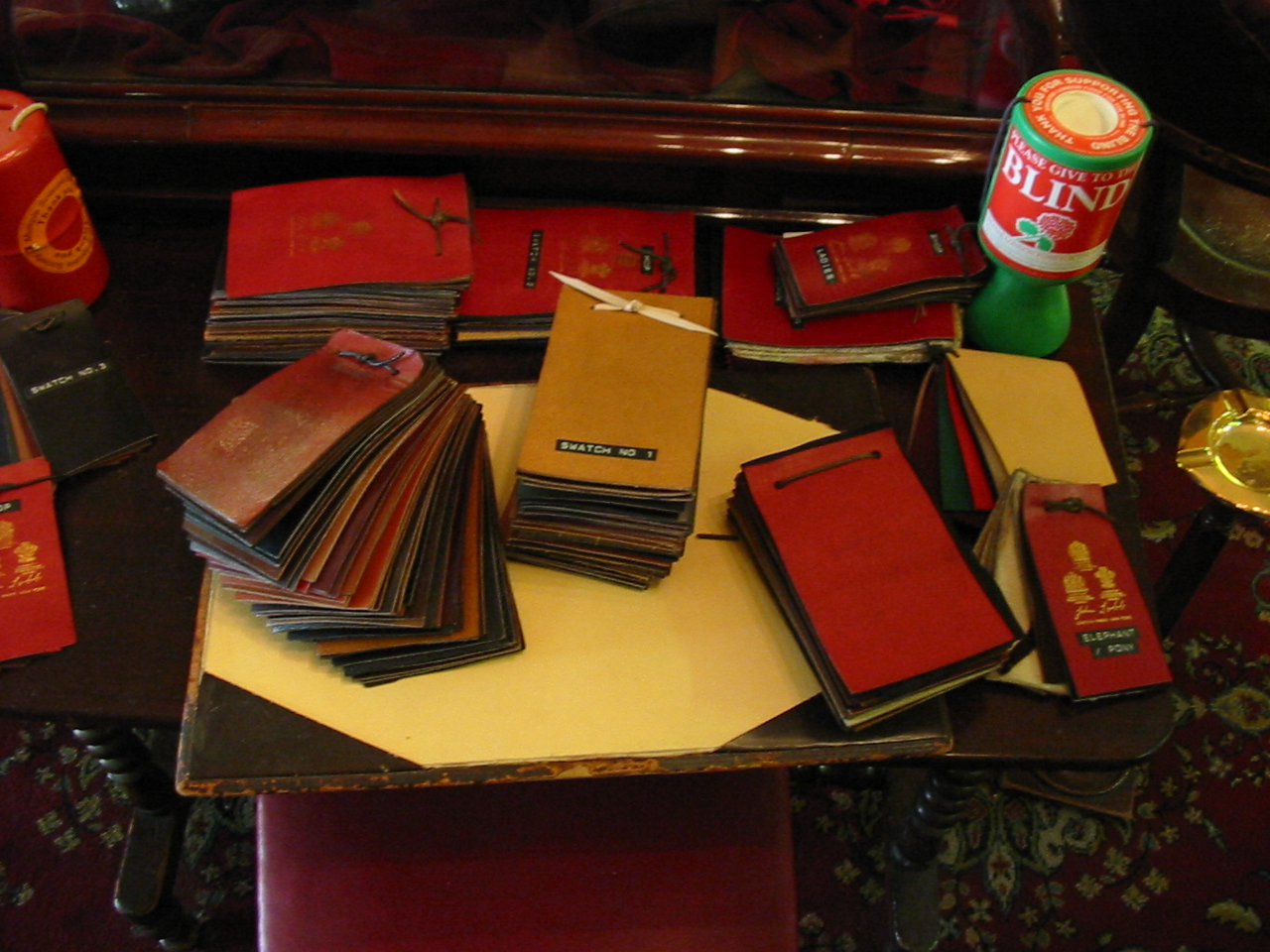
Selection of leather swatches at John Lobb, London

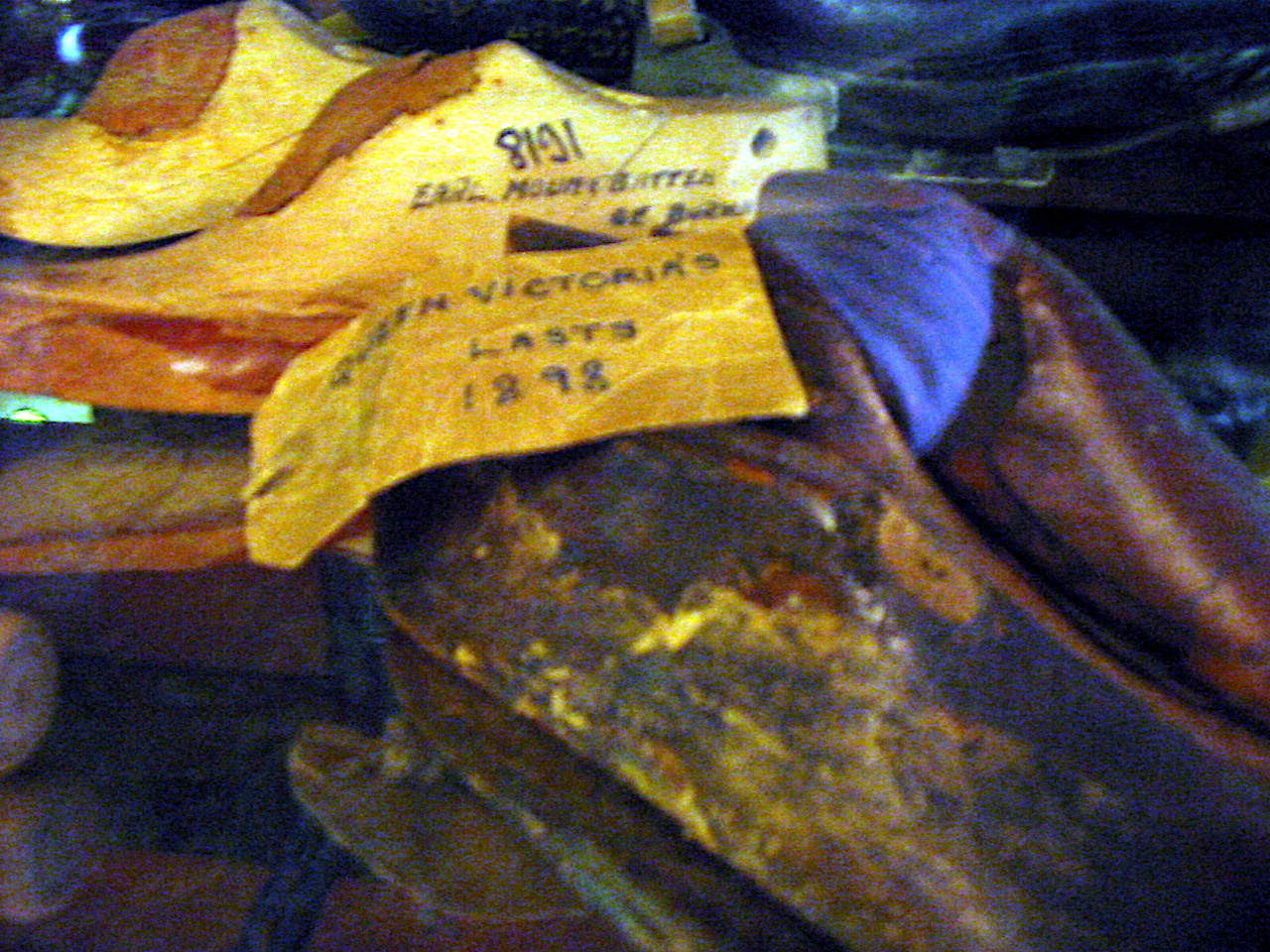
Shoe lasts of Queen Victoria

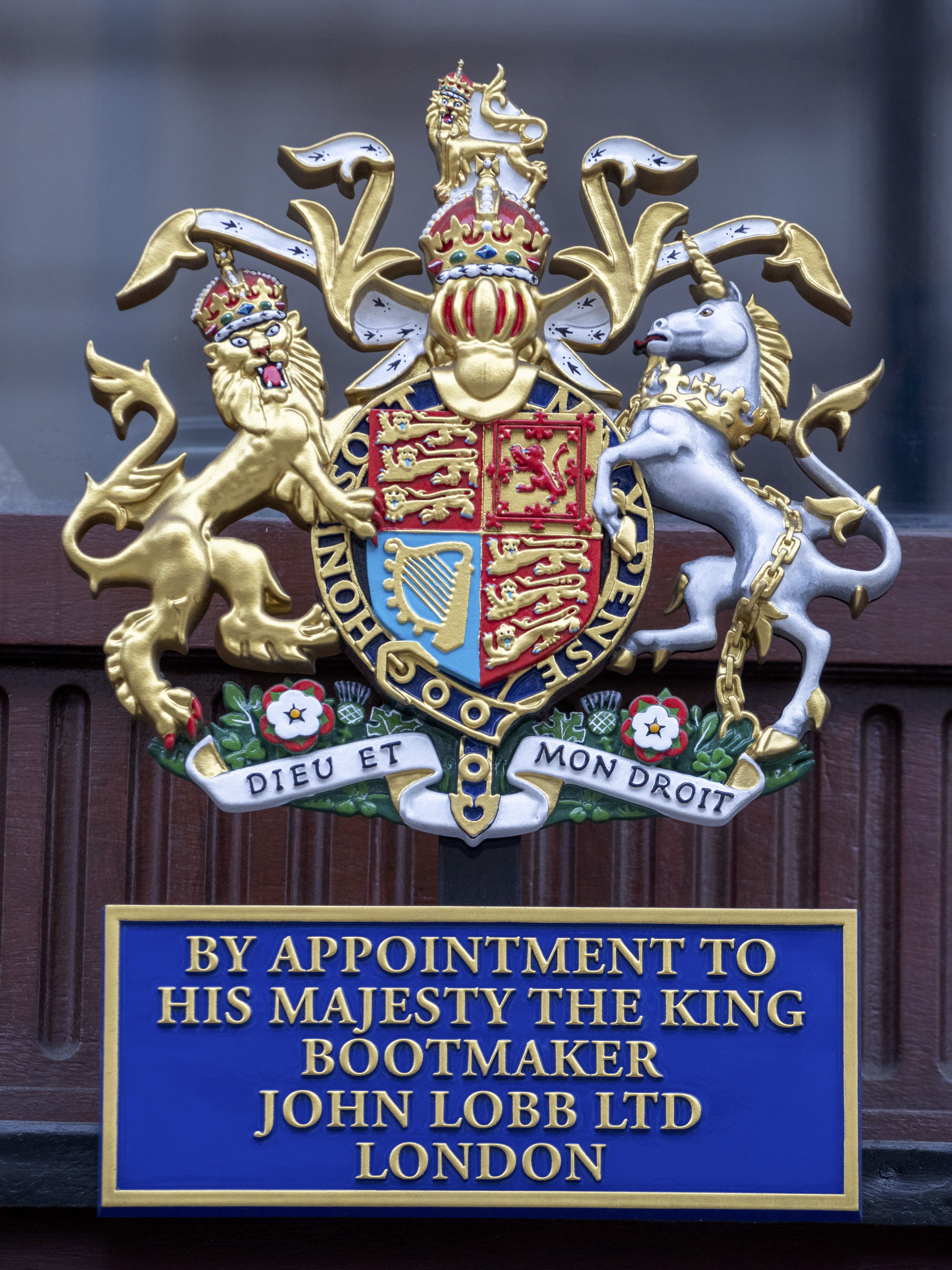
Royal Warrant of King Charles III in 2026

== See also ==
- Church's
- Edward Green & Co.
- Tricker's
