= Bespoke shoes =

Shoes and boots made to order for an individual customer

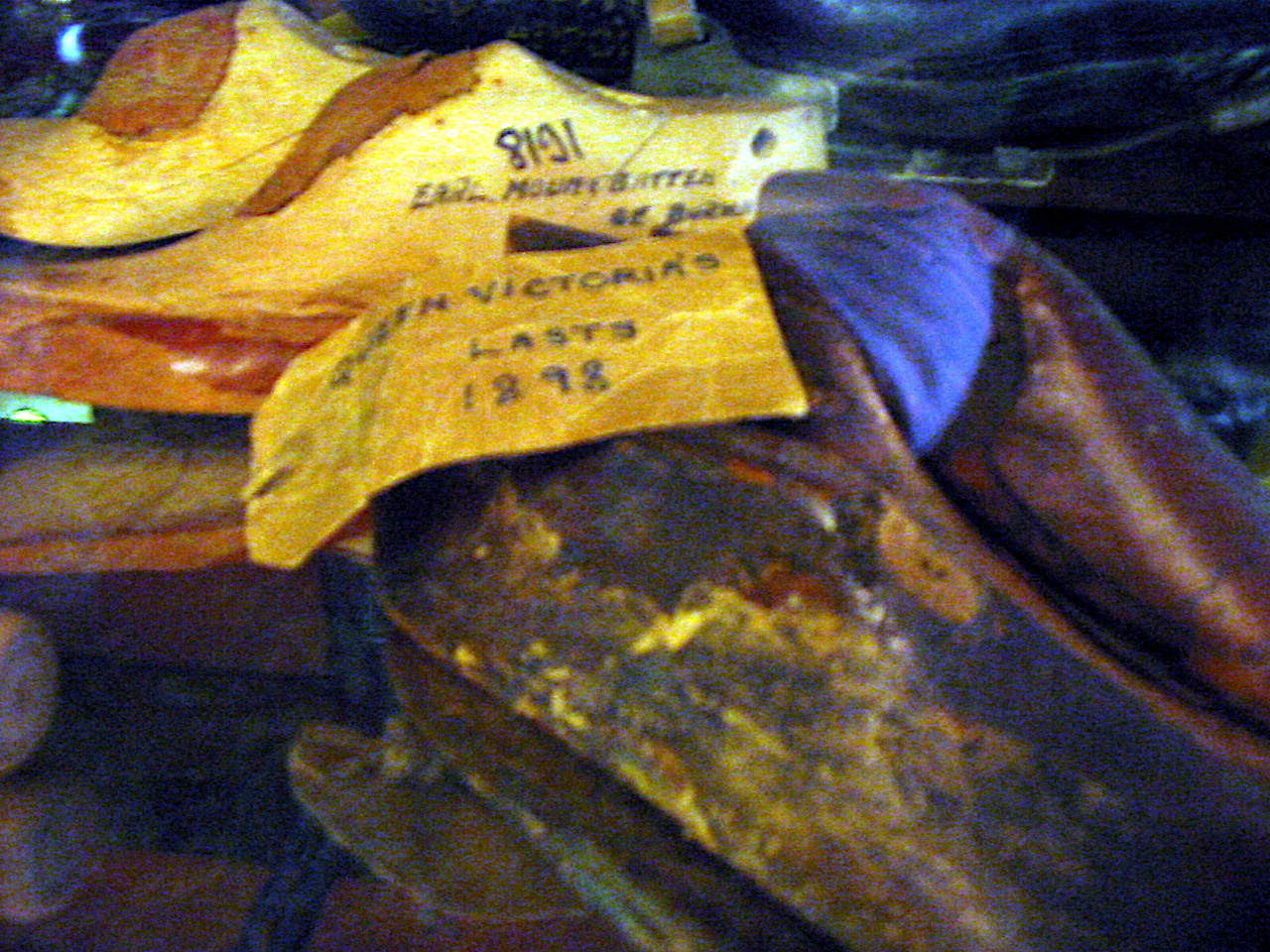
The shoe lasts of Queen Victoria from 1898 and Earl Mountbatten of Burma at John Lobb Bootmaker in London

Bespoke shoes, or custom shoes, are shoes made especially for a certain customer by a shoemaker. The feet are measured, and a last for each foot is created. At the fitting, the customer tries the prototype pair of shoes made in an inexpensive leather, and the shoemaker checks whether anything needs to be changed. If so, the changes are applied to the lasts, and the shoes are created with a precious leather. After the final lasts are created, the customer can order more pairs of shoes without more measurements and fittings.

== See also ==
- Bespoke
- Bespoke tailoring
- List of shoe styles
