= Made-to-measure =

Custom clothing cut and sewn using a standard-sized base pattern

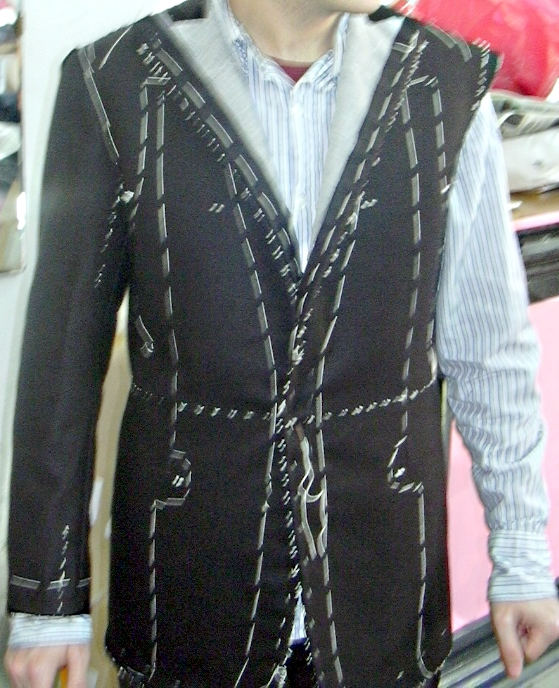
First fit of a tailored jacket

Made-to-measure (MTM) typically refers to custom clothing that is cut and sewn using a standard-sized base pattern. Suits and sport coats are the most common garments made-to-measure. The fit of a made-to-measure garment is expected to be superior to that of a ready-to-wear garment because made-to-measure garments are constructed to fit each customer individually based on a few body measurements to customize the pre-existing pattern. Made-to-measure garments always involve some form of standardization in the pattern and manufacturing, whereas bespoke tailoring is entirely made from scratch based on a customer's specifications with far more attention to minute fit details and using multiple fittings during the construction process. All else being equal, a made-to-measure garment will be more expensive than a ready-to-wear garment but cheaper than a bespoke one. "Custom made" most often refers to MTM.

== Overview ==
The made-to-measure process is simple considering that its purpose is to make an existing garment fit a person better. The very first step is for the tailor to take precise measurements of both the customer and the garment itself. Basic measurements taken include measurements of the chest, waist, seat etc., and most importantly, these measurements are taken as the tailor studies the posture of the person to make sure the garment won't be uncomfortable for the customer to wear. Then, the tailor will proceed to either cut the fabric of the original garment to make it fight tighter/smaller or will select the fabric that closest resembles the original garment's fabric to make it looser/bigger. A base pattern is similarly selected which most closely corresponds with the customer's measurements and is further altered to match the customer's measurements on the original garment. Lastly, the garment is given to the customer to try it on. Although the process is simple, it is however lengthy because tailors measure and remeasure the garment on the person to make sure it fits exactly how it's wanted.

Made-to-measure items typically have a price markup compared to their ready-to-wear counterparts due to the customization and personalized service involved in their production. The primary benefits to the customer of made-to-measure clothing are that the garments will be well-fitted to the customer's body and the customer may have the opportunity to customize the fabric and detailing. However, the primary disadvantage of made-to-measure is that the customer must wait up to several weeks for the garment to be sewn and delivered.

Made-to-measure retailers often travel internationally meeting clients in cities, providing samples of the latest materials and styles.

Unlike bespoke garments, which traditionally involves hand sewing, made-to-measure manufacturers use both machine- and hand-sewing. Made-to-measure also requires fewer fittings than bespoke, resulting in a shorter wait between customer measurement and garment delivery.

Made-to-measure is sometimes also referred to as personal tailoring.

== Advertising Standards Authority ruling ==
In the United Kingdom, the legal definition of "made-to-measure" has been conflated with bespoke tailoring by a ruling of the Advertising Standards Authority. The ruling is based on the Oxford English Dictionary definition of bespoke as "made to order". While this ruling clarified the difference between bespoke and ready-to-wear, it blurred the line between bespoke and made-to-measure.

The ruling established that a "made-to-measure suit would be cut, usually by machine, from an existing pattern, and adjusted according to the customer's measurements," while "a bespoke suit would be fully hand-made and the pattern cut from scratch, with an intermediary baste stage which involved a first fitting so that adjustments could be made to a half-made suit." The ruling concluded, however, that a "majority of people... would not expect that bespoke suit to be fully hand-made with the pattern cut from scratch," effectively equalizing the terms bespoke and made-to-measure.

While etymologist Michael Quinion observed that by definition "it was legitimate for a tailor offering clothes cut and sewn by machine to refer to them as bespoke, provided that they were made to the customer's measurements", since the traditional use of bespoke inside the tailoring community has been more nuanced than the Oxford definition, others concluded that the ASA "took a rather ignorant decision to declare that there is no difference between bespoke and made-to-measure."

== Comparison ==
In essence, MTM (made-to-measure) is a step up from pret-a-porter. It's affordable for most people and solves some of the common fit issues that shoppers may have with ready-to-wear garments. The main advantage of MTM is that the clothes will be adapted to the customer's physique and the customer can have the option of choosing fabric, details, sleeve length, pose adjustment, shirt length, jacket length, etc. The main disadvantage is that customers have to wait up to several weeks for the clothes to be ready and delivered. A typical price increase for a bespoke fashion item is 15% higher than the price of a ready-made garment. [7] Making bespoke MTM garments takes longer than ready-to-wear (RTW), but not as long as making bespoke garments. Unlike Bespoke, which is traditionally sewn by hand, makers or tailors use MTM for both machine and hand sewing. MTM production also requires fewer accessories than bespoke production, resulting in shorter waiting times between customers and delivery.

Advantages:

- Better body fit than RTW
- Customers choose fabrics and aesthetic details
- Faster production time than Bespoke
- Cheaper than Bespoke, slightly more expensive than RTW
- More precise and dedication

Disadvantages:

- More time than ready-made clothes
- Does not offer as many quality options as Bespoke
- Costs more than RTW; quality not necessarily better

== See also ==
- Ready-to-wear
- Mass Customization
- Bespoke tailoring
