= Bespoke tailoring =

Making men's clothing to an individual buyer's specification by a tailor

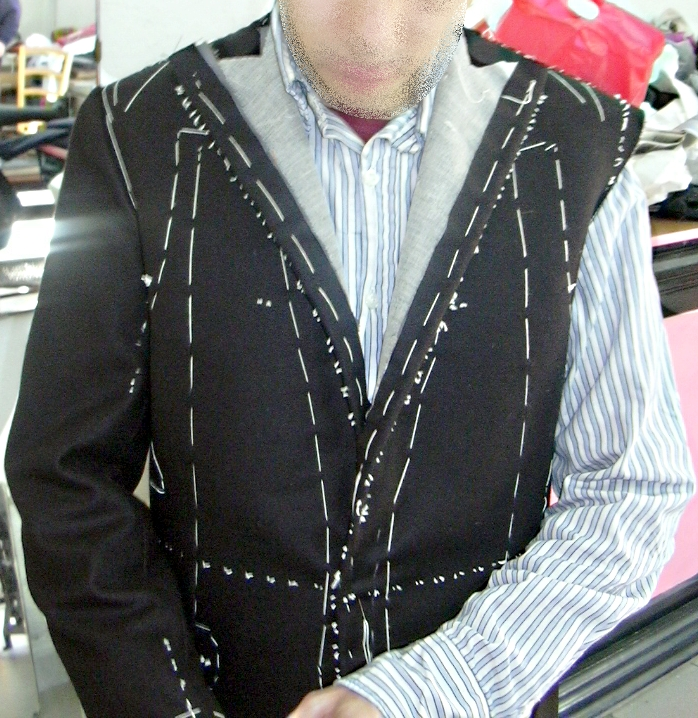
Fitting of a bespoke jacket

Bespoke tailoring (/biˈspoʊk/) or custom tailoring is clothing made to an individual buyer's specifications by a tailor. Bespoke garments are completely unique and created without the use of a pre-existing pattern, while made to measure uses a standard-sized pattern altered to fit the customer.

== Clothing ==
=== Meaning of the term ===
The word bespoke derives from the verb bespeak, to speak for something, in the specialised meaning of "to give order for it to be made." Fashion terminology reserves bespoke for individually patterned and crafted men's clothing, analogous to women's haute couture, as opposed to mass-manufactured ready-to-wear (off-the-peg or off-the-rack). The term originated on Savile Row, a street in London considered the "Golden Mile of tailoring".

Bespoke clothing is traditionally cut from a pattern drafted from scratch for the customer, and so differs from ready-to-wear, which is factory made in finished condition and standardized sizes; and differs from made to measure, which is produced to order from an adjusted block pattern. The opposition of terms did not initially imply that a bespoke garment was necessarily well built, but since the development of ready-to-wear in the beginning of the twentieth century, bespoke clothing is now more expensive and is generally accompanied by a high quality of construction. (Note: In an article published in Textile History (Volume 34, Number 2, November 2003, pp. 192–213. Ready-to-wear or Made-to-measure? Consumer Choice in the British Menswear Trade) Laura Ugolini concluded that "interested and well-informed male consumers generally preferred to buy bespoke suits: while usually more expensive than their ready-made counterparts, these were also perceived to be better quality, better looking, and better value, and therefore most likely to enhance the wearer's sense of self-worth as a manly, discerning and successful consumer".)

While the bespoke distinction conferred by haute couture is protected by law in France, (Note: A certain number of formal criteria, including the design for private customers with one or more fittings, must be met for a fashion house to use the label and a list of eligible houses is made official every year by the French Ministry of Industry.) the British Advertising Standards Authority has ruled it is a fair practice to use the term "bespoke" for products that do not fully incorporate traditional construction methods. The Savile Row Bespoke Association, a trade group of traditional tailors, disagrees, (Note: The tailor Richard Anderson wrote an article in the Telegraph to argue that "the ASA has got the ruling wrong" (Anderson, Richard (2008-06-18). "Savile Row tailor Richard Anderson: bespoke must mean bespoke". The Telegraph.).) but it has taken no formal step to challenge ASA's ruling.

== Overview ==
To order a bespoke garment, first the customer does a consultation with a tailor. This is when fabrics, linings, and styling details are chosen. Then the tailor measures the client, in order to draft a pattern from scratch based on the individual measurements. The fabric and lining are chalked out, cut with shears, which allows the tailor to baste the garment together for a fitting. During the fitting, details are fixed. After this the tailor finishes the garment and gives it to the customer. The typical time frame for a bespoke garment is 2–3 months, and there are usually 2-3 fittings done.

=== Compared to made-to-measure ===
A grey area has existed between the extremes of bespoke and ready-to-wear since the end of the 19th century (Note: In 1895, the Leeds Factory Clothing Co. veered between calling itself "manufacturing clothiers" and "bespoke tailors" (cf. Benson, John (2003). A Nation of Shopkeepers: Five Centuries of British Retailing. Houghton Mifflin Cookbooks. p. 102. ISBN 1-86064-708-1.).) in which a tailor measures the customer, but the garment is then made to the closest standard size, sometimes in a factory. The distinction made here is between bespoke, created without use of a pre-existing pattern, and made to measure, which alters a standard-sized pattern to fit the customer. Technological change makes this distinction more subtle, since fittings are increasingly required for made-to-measure. A bespoke service may require an individually-cut pattern, which is then kept should further suits be required; made-to-measure measurements are often stored on a computer. Even hand-work, often cited as a benchmark of bespoke, is now increasingly found in made-to-measure garments, while machine-making plays some part in the creation of most bespoke suits. With a bespoke suit, a pattern is designed and made from scratch based on the client's measurements, often from 20+ measurements involving multiple fittings, and takes considerably longer to produce than a made-to-measure garment. This ensures a precise fit, particularly in the shoulders as well as the posture areas. This custom fit is most suited for clients with short or long necks, high or low shoulders, excess girth, high hips, large or flat seats, and more. Made-to-measure cannot adjust for these shapes and slopes.

In addition, new technologies have allowed for bespoke garments to be made with lean manufacturing practices and digital patterning, making new patterns within minutes and fully bespoke garments in hours, at a price point similar to made to measure or even mass production.

== Advertising Standards Authority ruling ==
In June 2008, the Advertising Standards Authority (ASA), a British advertising regulator, ruled that an advertisement describing a suit "put into a 'working-frame' where it would be cut and sewn by machine" as a "bespoke suit uniquely made according to your personal measurements & specification" was not breaching the Authority's self-proclaimed advertising codes, notably the truthfulness rule, because the use of the term bespoke was not deemed likely to confuse. The ruling was significant in formalising a less traditional definition of bespoke clothing, even though the older distinction with made-to-measure was recognised.

The ruling cited the Oxford English Dictionary definition of bespoke as "made to order," and considered that despite the fact a bespoke suit was "...fully hand-made and the pattern cut from scratch, with an intermediary baste stage which involved a first fitting so that adjustments could be made to a half-made suit," while a suit made-to-measure "...would be cut, usually by machine, from an existing pattern, and adjusted according to the customer's measurements," "both fully bespoke and made-to-measure suits were "made to order" in that they were made to the customer's precise measurements and specifications, unlike off-the-peg suits."

Some, such as the etymologist Michael Quinion, feel the ruling showed that "the historic term of art had moved on." Some others concluded that "bespoke tailoring has traditionally, if unofficially, meant something more than the dictionary definition allows" and that the ASA "took a rather ignorant decision to declare that there is no difference between bespoke and made-to-measure."

== See also ==
- Bespoke
- Bespoke shoes
- Custom-fit
- Mass customization
- New bespoke movement
- Hong Kong Tailors
- Savile Row tailoring
- Neapolitan tailoring
