= John Crittle =

Australian fashion designer and retailer

Kenneth Malcolm John Crittle (15 December 1943 – 2 May 2000) was an Australian fashion designer and retailer, a co-founder of Dandie Fashions in 1966.

== Early life ==
Kenneth Malcolm John Crittle was born in Sydney, New South Wales, Australia. He was one of seven children of Charles Crittle and Sylvia Golden Crittle (née Rose). His brother, Peter Crittle, played 15 times for the Australian national rugby union team and was later a barrister. Through his mother, Crittle was a direct descendant of Thomas Rose, the English farmer who in 1793 was the first free settler to reach Australia.

== Career ==
Crittle arrived in London from Australia in 1963 and by 1965 was working for Michael Rainey in his Chelsea boutique Hung On You.

The London fashion boutique Dandie Fashions was opened in Autumn 1966, following a chance encounter at the Speakeasy Club between Freddie Hornik and Alan Holston, who then got together with Crittle and the Guinness heir Tara Browne, and launched the new business.

Dandie Fashions was initially at Kensington Mews, South Kensington, but quickly relocated to 161 King's Road, Chelsea in October 1966. Crittle and Tara Browne wanted a retail outlet for their new tailoring company Foster and Tara. In December 1966, Browne died in a car crash, while he was on his way to discuss shop front designs with the graphic artist David Vaughan. Crittle bought his share of the business. His clients included Princess Margaret, the Beatles and the Rolling Stones.

In 1968, Crittle's mother Sylvia arrived from Australia, but it being too late to book into a hotel, slept on the sofa in his King's Road store. Waking in the morning and ascending the staircase, she briefly thought that she saw Jesus in a long white robe with a halo at the top of the stairs. It was actually Jimi Hendrix in his dressing gown, and his "halo" was his expansive afro haircut backlit by the sun. According to Sylvia, he said "Hello, my name's Jimi. John told me I could sleep here tonight".

Crittle returned to Australia in 1974.

== Personal life ==
Crittle and his then-wife, the model Andrea Williams had a daughter in 1969, the ballet dancer Darcey Bussell (born Marnie Mercedes Darcey Pemberton Crittle). However, Crittle and Williams divorced when Bussell was three years old, and he returned to Australia, leaving the family in London. In 1975, Andrea Williams married the dentist Philip Bussell. Bussell makes no mention of Crittle in her autobiography; she did not attend his funeral.

Crittle also had a son and a daughter.

Crittle, who had been a heavy smoker for all of his adult life, died from emphysema on 2 May 2000, and is buried in Mullumbimby cemetery.
