= Sex (boutique) =

Former boutique in London

Coordinates: 51.4834°N 0.1774°W

SEX
- Interactive map of SEX
- Location: London, England
- Owner: Malcolm McLaren; Vivienne Westwood
- Type: Boutique

Construction
- Opened: 1974
- Closed: 1976

Sex (stylised SEX) was a boutique run by Vivienne Westwood and her then-partner Malcolm McLaren at 430 King's Road, London, between 1974 and 1976. It specialised in clothing that defined the look of the punk movement.

Westwood and McLaren's boutique underwent several name and correlating interior decor changes through the 1970s to connect with design inspirations, the boutique finally being renamed World's End in 1979, a name which (following a short period of closure) the shop retains to this day.

== History ==
=== Pre-SEX ===
430 Kings Road in London's Chelsea district had been the site of several fashion boutiques, including The 430 Boutique, operated by Carol Derry and Bill Fuller in the early 1960s; Hung On You run by Jane Ormsby Gore and Michael Rainey from 1967 to 1969; Mr Freedom from 1969 to 1970; and Paradise Garage from 1970 to 1971.

In October 1971, Malcolm McLaren and a friend from art school, Patrick Casey, opened a stall in the back of Paradise Garage, selling items collected by McLaren over the previous year, including rock & roll records, magazines, clothing, and memorabilia from the 1950s. The following month, Paradise Garage proprietor Trevor Myles relinquished the entire premises to McLaren and Casey.

They renamed the shop Let It Rock and stocked it with second-hand and new Teddy Boy clothes designed by Vivienne Westwood, McLaren's then-girlfriend. They painted the shop-front corrugated iron frontage black with the name pasted in pink lettering. The interior was given period detail, such as "Odeon" wallpaper and Festival of Britain trinkets, furnished in the style of a 1950s living room. The label was noted for its bespoke tailored drape jackets, skin-tight trousers, and thick-soled "brothel creepers" shoes. Let It Rock was soon covered in the London Evening Standard.

In 1973, the outlet interior was changed and the shop was renamed Too Fast To Live, Too Young To Die, to reflect a new range of clothing from Britain's early 1960s "rocker" fashions. The stock included chains, leather, and sleeveless t-shirts adorned with provocative statements, reflecting Westwood's politically-informed design inspirations. The boutique's name paid homage to James Dean. Signage featured a black background with white lettering spelling out the shop's new name around a large skull and crossbones, a new era of youth subculture was echoed.

=== SEX ===
In the spring of 1974, the shop underwent another refurbishment and was rebranded with the name SEX.

The façade included a 4-foot (1.2 m) sign of pink foam rubber letters spelling "SEX", and the interior of the boutique was covered with graffiti from the SCUM Manifesto and chickenwire. Rubber curtains covered the walls and red carpeting was installed.

SEX sold fetish and bondage wear supplied by existing specialist labels such as Atomage, She-And-Me and London Leatherman as well as designs by McLaren and Westwood. Pamela Rooke, better known as Jordan, was a sales assistant. Among customers at SEX were the four original members of Sex Pistols (the bass-player Glen Matlock was an employee as a sales assistant on Saturdays). The group's name was provided by McLaren in partial promotion of the boutique. In August 1975, nineteen-year-old John Lydon was persuaded to audition for the group by singing along to Alice Cooper's "I'm Eighteen" on the jukebox. Other notable patrons included occasional assistant Chrissie Hynde, Adam Ant, Marco Pirroni, Siouxsie Sioux, Steven Severin and the rest of the Bromley Contingent.

The store's designs confronted social and sexual taboos, and included T-shirts bearing images of the Cambridge Rapist's face hood, semi-naked cowboys from a 1969 illustration by the US artist Jim French, trompe-l'œil bare breasts by Rhode Island School of Design students Janusz and Laura Gottwald in the late 1960s, and pornographic texts from the book School for Wives ("I groaned with pain...in a soft corrosion") by the beat author Alexander Trocchi. Also featured were T-shirts with the slogan 'Prick Up Your Ears', a reference to the biography of influential proto-punk subversive Joe Orton, and text culled from the biography of Orton stating how cheap clothes suited him. Among the designs were clear plastic-pocketed jeans, zippered tops and the Anarchy shirt which used dead stock from the 1960s manufacturer Wemblex. These were bleached and dyed shirts and adorned with silk Karl Marx patches and anarchist slogans.

=== Seditionaries ===
In December 1976, 430 King's Road was renamed Seditionaries, trading under that title until September 1980. As Seditionaries: Clothes for Heroes, the boutique adopted brutalist interior and exterior styling: large murals depicting imagery of bomb damage, harshly bright lighting, and cavities perforating the ceiling created by McLaren, surrounded Westwood's innovative garments now considered punk signatures.

Designs were licensed by Westwood to the operators of the boutique at 153 King's Road, Boy (formerly Acme Attractions) who issued them, some with alterations, over the next eight years. Boy London was founded by Stephane Raynor and Israel-based businessman John Krivine in 1976 on the King's Road. Krivine sold the company in 1984.

=== World's End ===
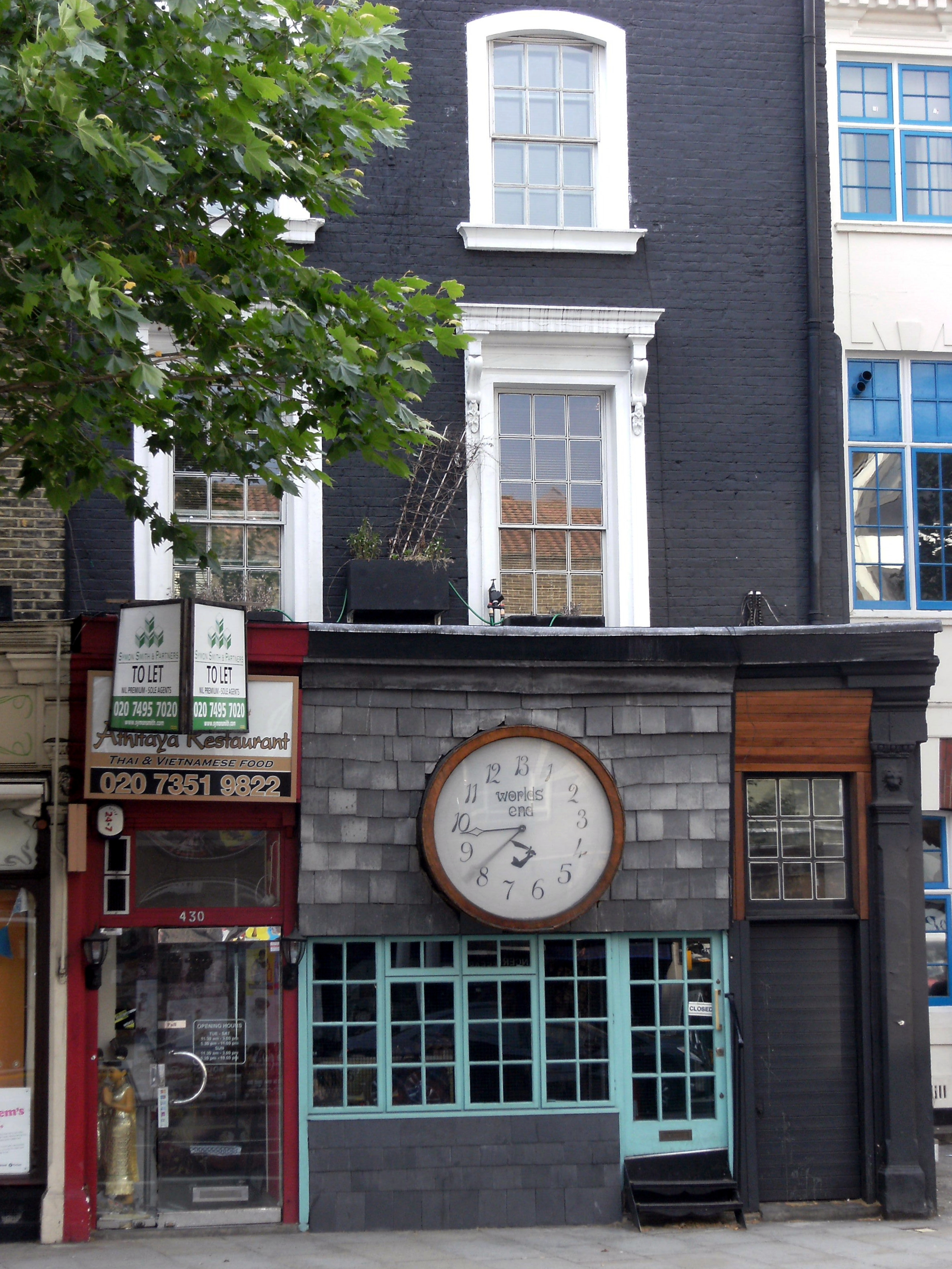
World's End

In late 1980, the shop at 430 King's Road re-opened under the name World's End. The building was designed by McLaren and Westwood and realised by Roger Burton, aided by Jeremy Blackburn and Tony Devers, to resemble a mixture of the Olde Curiosity Shoppe and an 18th-century galleon. The façade was installed with a large clock which spun backwards with the floor raked at an angle. McLaren and Westwood launched the first of a series of collections from the outlet at the beginning of 1981 and collaborated for a further three years. World's End remains open as part of Vivienne Westwood's global fashion empire.

== See also ==
- World's End, Kensington and Chelsea, the district.
- SEX: Too Fast To Live Too Young To Die, a compilation album of songs on their jukebox.
