= Louis Waymouth =

British writer and actor (born 1978)

- Born: Louis Alexander Philip Waymouth; 14 April 1978 (age 48); London, England
- Education: London Academy of Music and Dramatic Art
- Occupations: Writer, actor
- Years active: 2000–present
- Known for: The Late Late Show with James Corden, Saturday Night Live UK
- Spouse: Lady Eloise Anson (m. 2013)
- Children: 2
- Parent(s): Nigel Waymouth; Lady Victoria Yorke
- Relatives: Joseph Yorke, 10th Earl of Hardwicke (first cousin); Patrick Anson, 5th Earl of Lichfield (father-in-law)

Louis Alexander Philip Waymouth (born 14 April 1978) is a British comedy writer, actor, and producer. He is known for his work in television comedy in both the United Kingdom and the United States, including writing for The Late Late Show with James Corden, The Armstrong and Miller Show, and Psychobitches. In 2026, he joined the writing team of Saturday Night Live UK.

== Early life and background ==
Louis Waymouth was born in London in 1978. His father is artist Nigel Waymouth, co-founder of King's Road boutique Granny Takes a Trip and part of the two-man team Hapshash and the Coloured Coat, which designed psychedelic posters in the 1960s. His mother, Lady Victoria Yorke (1947–2004), was an interior designer who designed fabrics for Osborne & Little, and was a daughter of Philip Yorke, 9th Earl of Hardwicke.

Waymouth trained as an actor at London Academy of Music and Dramatic Art.

== Career ==
Waymouth started his career appearing in various television roles, including the BBC mini series Egypt and Charlie Brooker’s Black Mirror. He later moved into comedy writing, contributing to numerous British television programmes, including the BAFTA Award-winning The Armstrong and Miller Show, the Rose d’Or-winning Psychobitches, and Jim Henson’s Me and My Monsters. In 2012 he created the comedy web series Knighthood & Decoy with his writing partner Jamie Lennox, in which they both played the title roles.

In 2015, Waymouth joined the original writing team on The Late Late Show with James Corden. He remained on the show until its conclusion in 2023 and became one of its regular performers, appearing in numerous sketches and recurring pieces.

In 2019, his work on Carpool Karaoke: When Corden Met McCartney Live From Liverpool earned him an Emmy nomination. In 2020 he was nominated for a Writers Guild of America Award.

In 2018, Waymouth was also part of the writing team for the 60th Annual Grammy Awards.. In 2019 he produced The Kacey Musgraves Christmas Show.

== Personal life ==
On 7 September 2013, Waymouth married Lady Eloise Anson (born 1981) in Cranborne, Dorset. Lady Eloise is a prosthetic makeup artist and the daughter of Patrick Anson, 5th Earl of Lichfield, and Lady Leonora Grosvenor. She is also a goddaughter of Anne, Princess Royal. The couple have a daughter, Iris (born 2015), and a son, Jack (born 2017).
