= Dandie Fashions =

London fashion boutique founded in 1966

Coordinates: 51.4884°N 0.16698°W

- Founded: October 1966
- Founder: Freddie Hornik, Alan Holston, John Crittle, Tara Browne, and Neil Winterbotham
- Defunct: 1966
- Fate: Closed by little to no profit
- Area served: London, England

Dandie Fashions or sometimes referred to as Dandy Fashions was a London fashion boutique founded in 1966. The boutique was established following a chance encounter at the Speakeasy Club between Freddie Hornik and Alan Holston. They later teamed up with Australian John Crittle, the Guinness heir Tara Browne and Neil Winterbotham to launch the new business.

Dandie Fashions opened its shop at 161 King's Road, Chelsea in October 1966. Prior to this, John Crittle had worked for Michael Rainey in his boutique Hung On You. Crittle and Tara Browne wanted to create a retail outlet for their new tailoring company, Foster and Tara. However, in December 1966, tragedy struck when Browne died in a car crash, while he was on his way to discuss shop front designs with the graphic artist David Vaughan. Following Browne's death, Crittle bought his share of the business. In 1967, Amanda Lear was arrested at the boutique for possession of drugs belonging to The Rolling Stones.

Five months after opening their Apple Boutique on Baker Street (which ran from 7 December 1967 to 30 July 1968), the Beatles invested in Dandie Fashion, renaming it Apple Tailoring (Civil & Theatric). The band was attracted to King's Road by the presence of the clothing boutiques Dandie, along with Granny Takes a Trip and Hung On You.

Apple Tailoring opened at the same 161 King's Road premises as Dandie on 23 May 1968, with Neil Aspinall and Apple's accountant Stephen Maltz serving as directors. John Lennon and George Harrison attended the launch party. However, it never made a profit and closed some months later.
