= The Look Presents =

The Look Presents is a fashion label created by author Paul Gorman as a spin-off from his book The Look: Adventures In Rock & Pop Fashion.

The Look Presents was available through British retailer Topman with three collections in 2008-10: T-shirts by the 70s label Wonder Workshop and Nigel Waymouth, founder of King's Road store Granny Takes a Trip, as well as Priceless, ready-to-wear suits and other menswear by Antony Price, designer for Roxy Music, Bryan Ferry and Duran Duran.

In 2011 The Look Presents is a collaboration with artists John & Molly Dove on a special edition of their "Wild Thing" t-shirt, as worn by Marc Bolan and Sid Vicious.
