= Alan Holston =

British fashion entrepreneur

Alan Holston was a British fashion entrepreneur, one of the co-founders of Dandie Fashions, a Chelsea boutique that was a key part of Swinging London.

== Career ==
In 1966, following a chance encounter at the Speakeasy Club with Freddie Hornik, who worked there as a doorman, they combined forces with John Crittle and the Guinness heir Tara Browne, and launched Dandie Fashions.

Holston left in 1968, when it became the (short-lived) Beatles-funded Apple Tailoring, and became manager at the shirtmakers Deborah&Clare of Beauchamp Place, who were in business from 1965 to 1975. Holston entered the music business in 1974 with he newly-formed Anchor Records, which had hits with Ace, How Long and Stretch, Why Did You Do It?.
