= Deborah & Clare =

Clothing companies based in London

Deborah & Clare were bespoke shirtmakers based in London. The business was established by designers Deborah Wood and Clare Bewicke in 1965, working from a condemned basement. The shop soon became known for contemporary design. In 1967, the business moved to 27 Beauchamp Place, London SW3 where it became trendy. Wood and Bewicke sold the business in 1973. Examples of their work are in the Victoria & Albert Museum.

== History ==
Deborah Wood and Clare Bewicke started the business in 1965, working from a condemned basement in Walton Street, Chelsea. By 1967, the business was in Old Church Street, Chelsea.

Perceiving a general lack of innovation in men's apparel, they moved into the field of bespoke shirts, using a Greek shirtmaker in London's East End. At the time, custom-made men's shirts were largely the preserve of Jermyn Street, catering to a traditional elite. The shop soon became known for contemporary design.

A 1967 visit to New York produced an offer of backing from Ahmet Ertegun to open a London shop, but his prerequisite was that the shop carry the entire range of Levi jeans was dismissed as "much too serious," and the eventual backing came from David Astor. The pair moved to Beauchamp Place.

Additional shirtmakers, trained in Jermyn Street, were found after a search. Andy and Annie Mullins, who had between them the vital skills of Cutter and Collar-maker. "It's two girls on the game," Andy told his wife "making shirts as a cover up." Alan Holston, poached from Dandie Fashions in Kings Road became the popular manager. The shop was designed by David Mlinaric, and opened in December 1967. Terracotta walls with putty-coloured paintwork were the backdrop for polished glass shelves of stock shirts and racks of cloth. It was a cave of colour and attracted a global clientele.

Wood and Bewicke sold the business in 1973 and Wood went to work for Laura Ashley for ten years as head designer of clothes and textiles.

Examples of Deborah & Clare shirts are in the Victoria & Albert Museum.

== Sources ==
- Sunday Times Magazine 2 August 1970 cover
- Stern Journal No 52 1969 P 109
- The Times Friday 11 July 1969
- Evening Standard Monday 24 March 1975 'Leaving their shirts behind'
- Nicky Panicci collection of over 200 vintage Deborah & Clare men's shirts
