= Freddie Hornik =

Czech-born British fashion entrepreneur

- Hornik, at Granny Takes a Trip, Chelsea, 1970
- Born: Alfred Charles Walter; 19 January 1944; Brno, Protectorate of Bohemia and Moravia (now Czech Republic)
- Died: 19 February 2009 (aged 65); London, England
- Occupation: Fashion designer
- Labels: Dandie Fashions; Granny Takes a Trip

Alfred Charles Walter "Freddie" Hornik (19 January 1944 – 19 February 2009) was a Czech-born British fashion entrepreneur who bought the ailing Chelsea boutique Granny Takes a Trip at 488 Kings Road in 1969, and transformed it into a leading brand in Swinging London.

== Early life ==
Hornik was born in Brno in Protectorate of Bohemia and Moravia (now the Czech Republic), on 19 January 1944. As an infant he traveled with his widowed mother and his grandmother to Austria on the refugee "death marches". He lived in poverty in Vienna until 1947, when together they went to live with relatives in south London. Hornik's education at Streatham Grammar School was interrupted when he contracted tuberculosis, necessitating long stays in hospital.

== Dandie Fashions ==
At the instigation of his Polish stepfather, Hornik trained as a tailor and made rapid progress, having "learnt to make a suit in 10 days for eight guineas".

In the mid-1960s, following a chance encounter at the Speakeasy Club with Alan Holston, they got together with John Crittle and the Guinness heir Tara Browne, and launched Dandie Fashions. The Beatles invested in the firm in 1968 and for a short while it became the bespoke menswear supplier Apple Tailoring.

== Granny Takes a Trip ==
In 1969, Hornik took over the legendary boutique Granny Takes a Trip. This purchase was in a partnership with Gene Krell and Marty Breslau, both from New York, and together they expanded the business, adding shops in New York and Los Angeles.

Granny Takes a Trip bespoke creations were taken up by the leading rock stars of the time. In 1972, Lou Reed wore a Granny's suit in black velvet and rhinestones on the cover of his album Transformer. Also that year, Mick Jagger wore a Granny's tartan velvet jacket in the photo on the inside cover of Rolling Stones' Exile On Main St., and Todd Rundgren wore Hornik's sequined bolero jacket in a photo on the reverse side of the Something/Anything? gatefold sleeve.

In 1973, for the front cover of The Isley Brothers' album 3 + 3, Ronald Isley sported a Hornik jacket. In 1974, for the front cover of his album Caribou, Elton John wore a tiger-stripe jacket which had a Granny's label, allegedly sewn on by Hornik's assistant Roger Klein, who had acquired the item elsewhere secondhand.

However, by the mid-1970s, Hornik, who by now had a "penchant for drugs", Krell and Breslau were feuding with each other, and the business failed, with the London boutique closing in late 1974.

== Later life ==
In his later years, Hornik drove a mini-cab but ill health forced him to retire to South London. He never married.
