= Michael English (illustrator) =

British artist (1941–2009)

- Born: 5 September 1941; Bicester, Oxfordshire, England
- Died: 25 September 2009 (aged 68)
- Education: Ealing school of art
- Style: Poster art
- Spouse: Jaki English

Michael English (5 September 1941 – 25 September 2009) was a British artist known for poster designs he created in the 1960s for musicians such as Jimi Hendrix in collaboration with Nigel Waymouth and the design company they established, Hapshash and the Coloured Coat, and for several series of hyper realist paintings in the 1970s and 1980s.

== Biography ==
English was born in Bicester, Oxfordshire in 1941, the son of an RAF flying officer. His early childhood was spent moving around England with long holidays spent in the South West of Ireland where his mother came from. Throughout his childhood, he developed a fascination with drawing, often technical subjects such as aeroplanes and trains both of which remained a fascination throughout his life. His 'Machine Paintings' in the late 1970s and 1980s are a testament to this. In 1962 he entered Ealing College of Art where he took Roy Ascott's radical Groundcourse which had a major impact on his thinking. His work included commissioned paintings for both private individuals and public organisations, advertising art for companies such as Porsche and stamp series for the Royal Mail such as the 'British Buses' or 'British Motorcycles' He lived in London with his wife, Jaki, and continued to work right up until his death in 2009 following a long illness.

== Career ==
English's career was launched in London during the 1966, when he began to work with Nigel Waymouth, who owned the shop Granny Takes a Trip in the King's Road, which was a burgeoning counter-culture and bohemian centre of Swinging London. English was hired by Waymouth to create a mural for the shop, which was rapidly gaining international cult status. English incorporated "fairground murals, vernacular imagery and hand-crafted Victorian letter forms" into the mural, and during the same period, he also completed a mural for the Cale Street shop Hung On You in the trendy Chelsea area, owned by Michael Rainey. During this period he produced what he considered his 'best poster' for the underground club UFO established by John Hopkins, co-founder of the International Times.

English continued his business relationship with Waymouth when they established the graphic design company Hapshash and the Coloured Coat in 1967, producing poster art that had a strong influence on the youth counter-culture, similar to work being done in the United States by poster artists such as Jacqui Morgan. He contributed artwork, including two covers (issues 4 and 13) for the radical OZ magazine as part of Hapshash a collaboration which continued for two years. Throughout this time, English produced posters for leading performers such as Pink Floyd and Jimi Hendrix. He also created posters for the 1968 Liverpool Love Festival, and Love Me Film Productions.

English has been credited with creating "an English form of psychedelic poster art". English's works used contemporary Op Art techniques to create a visually jarring effect for the viewer, and had a bold, carnivalesque style similar to Pop Art. He also used evocative references to the decadent spirit of the 1890s Art Nouveau influences, such as Alphonse Mucha's posters, and the works of Aubrey Beardsley (a popular 1966 exhibit of Beardsley's works was held at the Victoria and Albert Museum). Other influences were eclectic and culturally wide-ranging, such as William Blake, Max Ernst, Magritte, Disney animation, Hindu symbolism, Japanese and Middle Eastern decorative designs, engravings of indigenous Americans, and other cultural ephemera that George Melly described as "a visionary and hallucinatory bouillabaisse".

In the 1970s, English moved away from psychedelic imagery towards Hyper Realist work, employing airbrush. He produced several different series of paintings, The Food Paintings (1969–70), including Fried Egg and Ketchup, The Rubbish Posters (1970), with the iconic 'Coke', an airbrush image of a used Coca-Cola bottle cap, and the Strikes Water Prints (1971) with images such as Ball Strikes Water. English's posters from this period sold in the millions. This shift towards a focus on concrete decadence perhaps prefigured punk rock in London. English also experimented with environmentalist happenings and oil lamp projections. In the mid to late 1970s and the 1980s he focused more keenly on two seemingly contrasting themes, the Machine Paintings, which are highly detailed sections of trains, planes and trucks and the Nature Paintings, which provided close-up fragments of nature images such as ivy leaves often juxtaposed with hard man-made surfaces. His interest in both these themes continued to play a major part in his subsequent career resulting in several large scale paintings.

== See also ==
- Printmaking
- Swinging London
