= Reasons to Be Cheerful =

Reasons to Be Cheerful may refer to:

- Reasons to Be Cheerful (book), a 2008 book by Paul Gorman about the graphic artist Barney Bubbles
- "Reasons to Be Cheerful" (short story), a 1999 short story by Greg Egan
- Reasons to Be Cheerful, a 2001 autobiography by Mark Steel
- Reasons to Be Cheerful, a 2019 novel by Nina Stibbe
- Reasons to Be Cheerful, a multimedia project by David Byrne that includes his 2018 album American Utopia
- Reasons to Be Cheerful, a politics podcast hosted by Ed Miliband and Geoff Lloyd

== See also ==
- "Reasons to be Cheerful, Part 3", a song by Ian Dury and the Blockheads
