= Tommy Roberts (designer) =

English fashion designer (1942–2012)

Thomas Steven Roberts (6 February 1942 – 10 December 2012) was an English designer and fashion entrepreneur who operated independent retail outlets including pop art boutique, Mr Freedom, and the 1980s decorative arts and homewares store, Practical Styling.

In 1969, Roberts was the first fashion business executive to license images from Walt Disney Productions, Ltd., and in 1972, he was the first fashion retailer to establish an outlet in London's Covent Garden. Roberts's shops sold designs worn as stagewear by Jimi Hendrix, Elton John, Mick Jagger and David Bowie. In the mid-1970s, he was the manager of the pub rock group Kilburn & the High Roads fronted by Ian Dury. Later in life, Roberts promoted sales of collectibles, artefacts and furniture through London outlets Tom-Tom and Two Columbia Road.

== Early life ==
Roberts was raised in Forest Hill and Deptford, London, UK, and attended Goldsmiths Art College. In the early 1960s, he collected antiques and operated espresso bars. He opened his first boutique, Kleptomania, at 10 Kingly Street, just off Carnaby Street, in 1966.

== Boutiques ==
In 1969, Roberts took over a hippy outlet called Hung on You, operated by the fashion designer Michael Rainey at 430 King's Road in World's End, Chelsea. With Trevor Myles, Roberts reopened the premises as Mr Freedom with a pop art concept using bright colours and designs by a team including Pamla Motown.

In December 1970, Roberts and Myles moved Mr Freedom to larger premises in Kensington, selling comic-strip clothes with kitsch homewares and "fun furniture". In the basement was restaurant Mr Feed'Em. In 1971, Cecil Beaton included Mr Freedom garments in the exhibition Fashion: An Anthology.

After the closure of Mr Freedom in 1972, Roberts opened the boutique City Lights Studio in Covent Garden. Among its customers was David Bowie, who wore a City Lights suit in photographs included in his 1973 album, Pin-Ups. Around this time, Roberts provided advice and a lawyer to Vivienne Westwood and Malcolm McLaren, who had taken over 430 King's Road and opened a store called Let It Rock.

== Antiques, furniture and collectibles ==
In the late 1970s, Roberts operated in the antique trade. In 1981, he and partner Paul Jones opened a homewares and furniture outlet called Practical Styling at Centre Point on St. Giles High Street, Central London.

Identified as pioneering "high-tech" design, Practical Styling caught the post-modern spirit of the times as exemplified by Memphis Group and fused it with British kitsch and American hardware, selling day-glo coloured metal dustbins, diner crockery, luncheonette fittings and rolls of carousel flooring as well as yellow and black vinyl stools, Bakelite telephones, palette-shaped coffee tables and plastic poodle lamps.

From 1995, Roberts sold original art and design collectibles at his store, Tom-Tom.

In 2001, Roberts opened Two Columbia Road in Hackney, east London, selling contemporary furniture and artefacts. He retired in the middle of the same decade.

== Legacy ==
Mr Freedom, a design product sold through Roberts's boutiques has appeared at auction. Marc Bolan's Mr Freedom jacket was featured in a Christie's popular culture and entertainment sale in June 2011.

Paul Smith contributed the foreword to a book about Roberts's life and career, Mr Freedom – Tommy Roberts: British Design Hero, by Paul Gorman, published in July 2012.
