= Neil Winterbotham =

British fashion entrepreneur (died 2019)

Neil Winterbotham was a British fashion entrepreneur and one of the founders of the London fashion boutique, Dandie Fashions.

Dandie Fashions founded by Winterbotham and Tara Browne, an heir to the Guinness fortune, opened at 161 King's Road in November 1966. Browne died in a car crash the following month.

Winterbotham was also responsible, with Dave Howson, for the management of the Middle Earth club, an early hippie music venue in London.

Neil Winterbottom's attended Westminster School. Photographs of Neil in dandy-style fashions in 1967 were originally taken for an article in Life magazine featuring King's Road fashions in 1967. He died in 2019.
