= Leslie Russell (hairdresser) =

British hairstylist (1943–2022)

Leslie Russell (7 May 1943 – 23 December 2022) was a British hairstylist active in London during the 1960s. He created Anna Wintour's bob haircut and co-founded the Smile salon in London.

== Biography ==
Born in Carshalton, Surrey. He left school at the age of 15. Russell began hairdressing after a back injury ended his ambition to become a footballer. He trained in south London, later joining the Leonard of Mayfair salon in 1964, where he adopted Leonard Lewis's approach that hairstyles should reflect an individual's personality.

In 1965, Russell gave Anna Wintour, then aged 15, a short bob with a heavy fringe, which she maintained throughout her life. He also styled Cathy McGowan, presenter of the TV program Ready Steady Go!, who was his partner at the time.

In 1969, Russell and Keith Wainwright opened the Smile salon in Knightsbridge. Smile was among London's first unisex salons, where he styled Cilla Black, Michael Parkinson, Janet Street-Porter, Barbara Hulanicki, Elton John, and Bryan Ferry. The salon later relocated to the King's Road near Vivienne Westwood's shop.

Russell married model Janet Tillett in 1970; they had two daughters. Following the end of their marriage, he lived above the Smile salon. Later in life, he experienced cluster headaches and became interested in Buddhism. He continued hairdressing after the closure of Smile in 2014, working from a smaller salon. Russell died at age 79 from lung cancer.
