= Paul Gorman =

English writer

Paul Gorman is a British writer and curator.

Gorman's journalism has appeared in magazines and newspapers; his books include The Life & Times of Malcolm McLaren, The Story Of The Face: The Magazine That Changed Culture, Straight with Boy George, Nine Lives with Goldie and Totally Wired: The Rise & Fall of The Music Press.

Gorman has also staged art, design and pop culture exhibitions in the UK, Denmark, France and the US.

== Journalism ==
From 1978, Gorman worked on weekly news for trade publications and in 1983 won the Periodical Publishers Association award for campaigning journalism for a series of investigative food industry articles. In 1990 he was appointed west coast bureau chief of Screen International, based in Los Angeles.

Between 1993 and 1998, Gorman was contributing editor at Music Week, reporting on executives and artists such as Madonna's manager Freddy DeMann, Creation Records founder Alan McGee and U2 manager Paul McGuinness. Between 1994 and 1999, Gorman was contributing editor at Music Business International. During this time he contributed regularly to magazines such as Mojo and conducted the first published interview with the Spice Girls.

Having contributed to magazines and newspapers including GQ, The Daily Telegraph, Mojo and Vice, Gorman is a contributing editor at designer Jermaine Gallacher's interiors magazine TON.

== War Child think tank ==
In 1993 Gorman was recruited to a think tank run by Anthea Norman Taylor and her partner Brian Eno to create fund-raising ideas for the charity War Child. The think tank was made up of a handful of people included the late prominent music business PR Rob Partridge and produced a series of events which attracted much media attention and raised money and profile for the charity.

These included 'Little Pieces From Big Stars', an exhibition and auction held at London's Flowers East gallery in October 1994 featuring works of art by musicians such as Billy Bragg, Charlie Watts, Paul McCartney, Billy Childish, Boy George and Shane MacGowan, and 'Pagan FunWear', a fashion catwalk show and auction held in June 1995 at the Saatchi Gallery featuring contributions from Bono, Laurie Anderson, Lou Reed, Jarvis Cocker and many others.

== Television and film ==
In the mid 1990s Gorman worked with production company Channel X on developing the trash culture TV series The Strip he created with partner David Knight for Channel 4.

In 1999 Gorman directed the documentary Las Vegas Grind for Channel 4. This was hosted by Mexican-American artist El Vez, who Gorman subsequently signed to Alan McGee's record label Poptones, which released two El Vez albums and the single Feliz Navidad in the UK.

In 2012 Gorman produced and presented The Kings Road Music & Fashion Trail, a series of short films for Royal Borough of Kensington & Chelsea council on addresses which housed significant boutiques, including Mary Quant's Bazaar and Granny Takes a Trip.

== Fashion ==
In 2008, Gorman launched fashion label The Look Presents through Topman with three collections based on artist and designers featured in his book The Look: Adventures In Rock & Pop Fashion: T-shirts by Wonder Workshop; T-shirts by Granny Takes a Trip founder Nigel Waymouth; and Priceless – a menswear range by Antony Price, designer for Roxy Music and Duran Duran.

== Exhibitions and curating ==
In 2010 Gorman curated the exhibition Process: The Working Practices Of Barney Bubbles at London's Chelsea Space. The show attracted the largest attendance of any exhibition held at the gallery.

In 2011 Gorman consulted on, and sourced material for, the British exhibitions Postmodernism: Style and Subversion 1970–1990 and Snap Crackle & Pop: British Pop Art Meets The High Street In The Swinging Sixties. In September 2011, Gorman staged a dedicated Barney Bubbles exhibit at Mindful of Art, a group show at London's Old Vic Tunnels.

In 2012 Gorman curated the exhibition Lloyd Johnson: The Modern Outfitter, presenting the work of the London fashion retailer whose boutiques provided clothing for a variety of performers including Fred Astaire, George Michael, The Clash, Tom Waits and Bob Dylan.

Gorman consulted on and sourced material for British Design 1948–2012: Innovation in the Modern Age, which ran from March – August 2012 at the V&A.

Also in 2012, Gorman curated The Past The Present & The Possible, a dedicated section presenting 300 artworks by Barney Bubbles as part of the group exhibition White Noise: Quand Le Graphisme Fait Du Bruit at Les Subsistances, Chaumont, Champagne Sud, France.

Gorman consulted on and sourced material for Glam! The Performance of Style, an exhibition about the visual, social and creative aspects of the 70s glam rock genre which opened at Tate Liverpool in February 2013 and moved to Frankfurt's Schirn Kunsthalle in June 2013 and Lentos Kunstmuseum in Linz, Austria, from October 2013 to February 2014.

In 2014, Gorman co-curated an exhibition about Malcolm McLaren's engagement in fashion with Young Kim of the Malcolm McLaren Estate. Staged as part of the Copenhagen International Fashion Fair, it was entitled Let It Rock: The Look Of Music The Sound Of Fashion. The exhibition was based around six sections dedicated to the retail outlets McLaren operated with Vivienne Westwood in the 1970s and 80s.

The exhibition received a positive response from the media. Financial Times fashion editor Charlie Porter noted "the hang of the garments is exceptional" while prominent style blogger Susie Bubble greeted the exhibition as "an incredibly detailed and well-put together overview specifically about McLaren's fusion of music and fashion".

In autumn 2014 Gorman was one of the curators of Art In Pop, an exhibition about the engagement between the worlds of art and popular music at the Centre National d'Art Contemporain gallery Magasin in Grenoble, France. Overseen by Magasin curator Yves Aupetitallot, Art In Pop included a large space curated by Gorman and Young Kim dedicated to McLaren's work and including clothing exhibits, a soundtrack and photographs of his student paintings executed in the late 60s. Marie France described it as "an invigorating exhibition not just to see but hear as well".

In 2017-18, Gorman curated a series of exhibitions for home leisure specialist Sonos on The Face magazine and David Bowie at the company's stores in London, New York and Berlin.

In 2018 Gorman curated Print! Tearing It Up, an exhibition at central London's Somerset House about the resurgence of independent magazines in the digital age.

Gorman's archive of alternative and countercultural magazines was represented by around 40 exhibits in the exhibition Subscribe: Artists & Alternative Magazines, 1970-1995 at the Art Institute of Chicago from December 2021 to May 2022.

== Plagiarism case against Vivienne Westwood, Ian Kelly and Picador ==
In October 2014, following the publication of the authorised biography Vivienne Westwood by the fashion designer and her co-author Ian Kelly, Gorman accused the authors and the publisher Picador of plagiarising substantial sections of material from his book The Look: Adventures In Rock & Pop Fashion. Gorman also described the Westwood biography as "sloppy" and "riddled with inaccuracies" and claimed it contained serious libels against two individuals, one of whom was pronounced to be dead by Westwood when in fact the individual was alive and practising as a therapist in west London.

Picador publisher Paul Baggaley told The Bookseller: "We always take very seriously any errors that are brought to our attention and, where appropriate, correct them."

Subsequently, the paperback edition included 27 new citations to Gorman's book.

== Books ==
- Granny Takes A Trip: High Fashion & High Times at the Wildest Rock'n'Roll Boutique (White Rabbit Books, September 2025. Forewords: Anna Sui and Amber Butchart
- Totally Wired: The Rise & Fall of the Music Press (Thames & Hudson, September 2022).
- The Wild World of Barney Bubbles: Graphic Design & The Art of Music (Thames & Hudson, June 2022). Essays: Peter Saville and Clarita Hinojosa, Conversation with Art Chantry, Introduction: Billy Bragg.
- The Life & Times of Malcolm McLaren: The Biography (updated and revised paperback, Constable, November 2021).
- The Life & Times of Malcolm McLaren: The Biography (Constable, April 2020). With a foreword by Alan Moore and an essay by Lou Stoppard.
- The Story Of The Face: The Magazine That Changed Culture (Thames & Hudson, November 2017). Foreword by Dylan Jones.
- Derek Boshier: Rethink/Re-Entry (Thames & Hudson, November 2015). Edited by Gorman. With a foreword by David Hockney.
- Mr Freedom: Tommy Roberts – British Design Hero (Adelita, June 2012). Foreword by Sir Paul Smith.
- As editor: Any Day Now: David Bowie The London Years 1947-74 by Kevin Cann (Adelita, November 2010).
- Reasons To Be Cheerful: The Life & Work Of Barney Bubbles (Revised and updated, Adelita, October 2010). Essay: Peter Saville, Foreword: Malcolm Garrett, Introduction: Billy Bragg, Conversation with Art Chantry.
- Rebel Rebel: Anti-Style with Keanan Duffty (Adelita, September 2009). Foreword by BP Fallon.
- Reasons To Be Cheerful: The Life & Work Of Barney Bubbles (Adelita, November 2008). Essay: Peter Saville, Foreword: Malcolm Garrett, Introduction: Billy Bragg.
- Cry Salty Tears (Arrow Books, June 2007). Foreword by Boy George.
- The Look: Adventures In Rock & Pop Fashion (Adelita, May 2006). Introduction by Sir Paul Smith, foreword by Malcolm McLaren.
- Blood & Fire: The Story Of UB40's Ali & Robin Campbell with Tim Abbot (Century, October 2005).
- Straight with Boy George (Century, June 2005).
- Let's Make This Precious: The Story Of Dexys Midnight Runners with Kevin Rowland (Virgin Books, 2003). Unpublished
- Nine Lives with Goldie (Hodder & Stoughton, November 2002).
- In Their Own Write: Adventures In The Music Press (Sanctuary, November 2001). Foreword by Charles Shaar Murray.
- The Look: Adventures In Pop & Rock Fashion (Sanctuary 2001). Foreword by Malcolm McLaren.

== Catalogues ==
- Print! Tearing It Up (Somerset House 2018). ISBN 978-1-9996154-0-6
- Eyes For Blowing Up Bridges: Joining the dots from the Situationist International to Malcolm McLaren (ed. John Hansard Gallery 2015). ISBN 978-0-85432-991-5
- Lloyd Johnson: The Modern Outfitter (Chelsea Space 2012). ISBN 978-1-906203-57-3
- Process: The Working Practices of Barney Bubbles (Chelsea Space 2010). ISBN 978-1-906203-44-3

== Guides ==
- London Calling: The Clash In The Capital (Herb Lester Associates 2026). ISBN 978-1-9191842-3-4
- Down The Road Apiece: The Rolling Stones' London 1962-71 (Herb Lester Associates 2025). ISBN 978-1-0685234-1-0
- David Bowie's London (Herb Lester Associates 2025). ISBN 978-1-0685234-7-2
- Situation Vacant: Sex Pistols & Malcolm McLaren in London (Herb Lester Associates 2021). ISBN 978-1-8382167-1-9
- Punk London: In The City 1975-78 (Herb Lester Associates 2016). ISBN 978-1-910023-61-7
- The Look Of London (Herb Lester Associates 2012). ISBN 978-1-910023-09-9

== Awards ==
- The Look: Adventures in Rock and Pop Fashion was named in the top ten fashion books of all time by The Independent.
- Reasons to be Cheerful won Mojo's "Book of the Year" in 2010.
