= Michael Rainey =

Australian-British fashion designer (1941–2017)

Michael Sean O'Dare Rainey (21 January 1941 – 29 January 2017) was an Australian-born British fashion designer, best known for his 1960s London boutique, Hung On You.

== Early life ==
Rainey was the son of Sean Rainey and Joyce Marion Wallace (1923–2006), better known as Marion Wrottesley, after her later marriage to Richard Wrottesley (later 5th Baron Wrottesley).

== Career ==
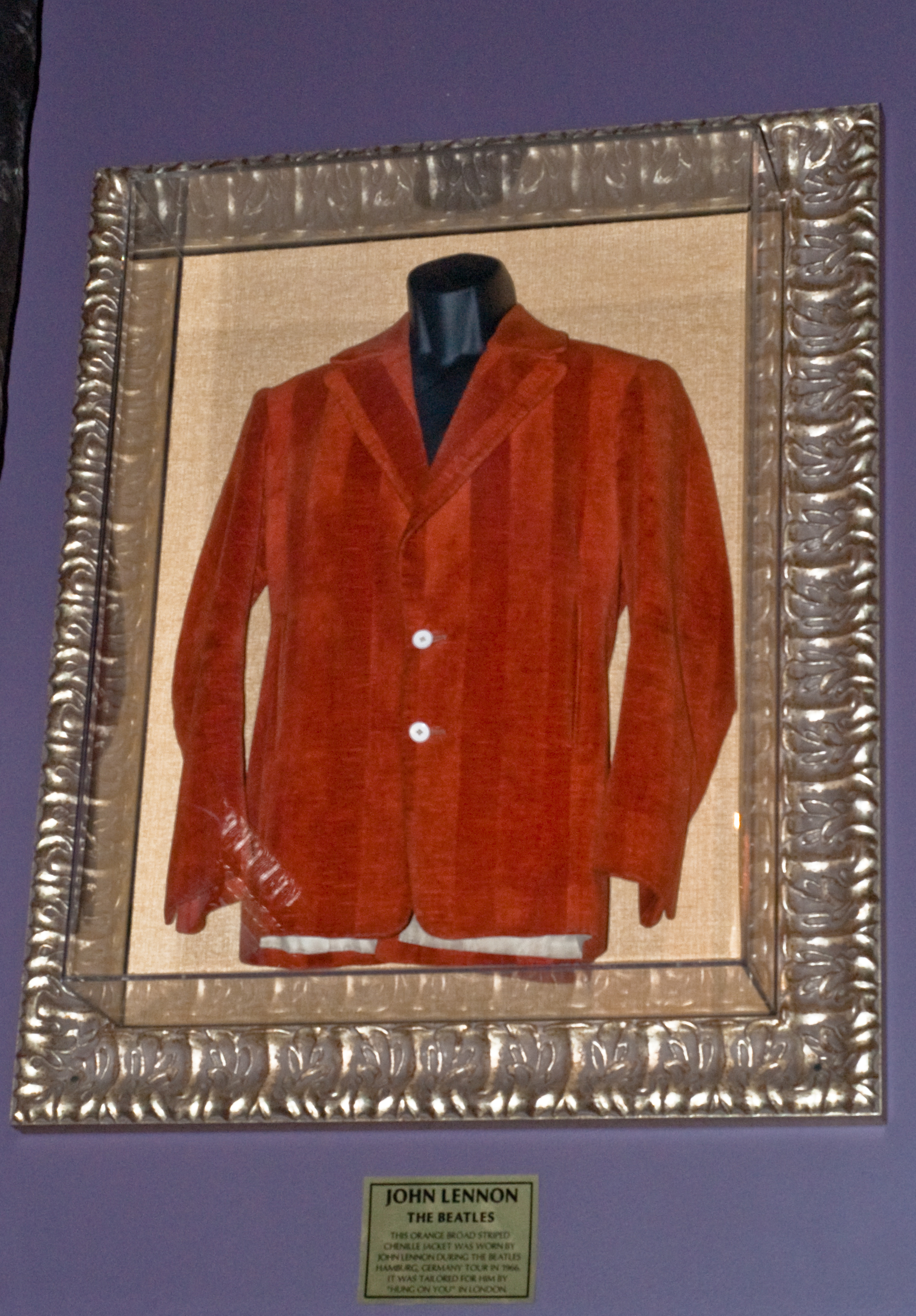
Hung On You jacket tailored for John Lennon and worn by him during the Beatles 1966 German tour in Hamburg.

In December 1965, Rainey, together with his then wife Jane Ormsby Gore, opened the fashion boutique Hung On You, at 22 Cale Street, London, with a mural by Michael English. Rainey had no previous experience in the fashion business or in retailing, and instead was inspired by his well-dressed friends including his wife's brother Julian Ormsby Gore, and the antique dealer Christopher Gibbs. The decor and tailoring were somewhat similar to Nigel Waymouth and Sheila Cohen's Granny Takes a Trip, which opened three months later in February 1966. His wife Jane Ormsby Gore had been making regular visits to India, looking for fabrics, so there was also an oriental accent to the clothes, as well as a repurposing and reuse of vintage garments and designs.

Rainey later relocated Hung On You to 430 King's Road, Chelsea. His then wife, Jane Ormsby Gore, in a 2006 interview with the V&A Museum said,

Michael made the most gigantic mistake of leaving Cale Street and going onto the King's Road. He felt that it was happening on the King's Road, but it cost a lot of money to move, and people didn't know where we were. It became less successful then. Before it was slightly more slick, with a big jardinière mirrored thing in the middle of the shop. We had got two children by then, and we were seriously into soul seeking and going on fasts and meditating... We left London, sold everything, gave away everything, and went to live in Gozo. London times and everything were over.

He sold the lease to the boutique in 1969 to Tommy Roberts and it became Mr Freedom.

Rainey was particularly known for flowery shirts and kipper ties in bold colours. Rainey's customers included musicians Mick Jagger and The Rolling Stones, The Beatles, The Kinks and the actor Terence Stamp.

According to Nik Cohn in his book "Today there are no gentlemen", Hung On You "was simultaneously the last fling of dandyism and the first intimation of Hippie, of strangenesses to come".

== Personal life ==
Rainey married Jane Ormsby-Gore, the eldest daughter of David Ormsby-Gore, 5th Baron Harlech, about whom the V&A notes "widely perceived as a style leader of her generation, Jane Ormsby-Gore worked for Vogue in the early 1960s". She also worked with the antique dealer Christopher Gibbs.

Rainey latterly lived in Granada, and had been based in Spain for many years. He died in January 2017 at the age of 76.
