= Alex Michon =

British artist and writer

Psychobilly Death Doll, painting by Alex Michon, shown in Goth Moth at the Transition Gallery in 2004

Alex Michon is a British artist and writer, based in London, who runs the Transition Gallery in Hackney with Cathy Lomax.

== Career ==
Alex Michon gained an MA in Fine art at Central Saint Martins College of Art and Design, London in 2003. She exhibits her work, which is mostly painting and drawing. She also writes for Arty magazine and Garageland. Since 2004 Michon has been a co-director of The Transition Gallery and in 2005 became editor (with Olly Beck) of Critical Friend a review-based art publication.

Michon's work in the Girl on Girl show at the Transition Gallery in 2004 was described:

Alex Michon draws, paints, embroiders and decoupages over the pages of romantic fiction and linen hankies; layering images of sexual encounters, and personal disappointments she disrupts the nicey, nicey text whilst acknowledging a fascination with its romantic hinterland of imaginary fulfilment.

Michon is also known for having worked with The Clash in 1977–83, when she designed several ranges of clothing for the band. Some of her shirts were included in Mick Jones' The Rock & Roll Public Library at Chelsea Space in London. She is currently writing a book about her work with The Clash, and is also featured in Paul Gorman's book The Look: Adventures In Rock & Pop Fashion.
