= Mr Freedom (fashion) =

1960s London clothing boutique

Coordinates: 51.50°N 0.19°W

Mr Freedom was a clothing boutique in London which sold fashion by a number of young designers commissioned by the owner, designer Tommy Roberts, and his partner, Trevor Myles. Celebrities such as Freddie Mercury and Elton John wore designs from the shop which was at 430 King's Road in Chelsea, London from 1969–70 and then at 20 Kensington Church Street in Kensington.

== History ==
Mr Freedom was part of the counter-culture "Swinging London" scene around King's Road in 1960s' London. It followed the cult success of Roberts' earlier boutique, Kleptomania, which he had opened in 1965. Roberts bought the lease to the King's Road boutique, at number 430, in 1969 from Michael Rainey, who had owned another boutique with a cult following at that location, Hung On You. At Myles' suggestion, Roberts named the shop after the 1969 William Klein film Mr. Freedom, which was a spoof of the anti-war movement.

Roberts' designs featured styles now considered typical of the era: broad-brimmed hats, close-fitting maxi dresses, silk-screened cartoon character images on jersey tops, and winged shoes. Bright colours were also characteristic of the clothing. Rather than continuing with the homespun hippie style popular among the youth during the 1960s, Roberts veered away from nostalgia. Mr Freedom carried styles that were "brash, pop art fashion", such as satin ties for men, satin jackets, T-shirt dresses with appliqued "satin stars, thunderbolts, and ice-cream cones". A dose of 1950s retro was added to the mix of influences by 1972.

Roberts produced clothes for the boutique in collaboration with a number of other young avant-garde designers, "many of them gathered in from outside the pale of the fashion trade". The shop was described as having an "unquenchable enthusiasm for all things bright and in outrageously bad taste". In 1970, Elton John hired Roberts to design several concert outfits before he set out on an American tour. Roberts designed a "yellow boiler suit" with a piano appliqué on the back, and "white boots with green wings". The shop was known for kitschy design as much as the clothes themselves. An inflatable sex doll was used as a mannequin.

Roberts operated Mr Freedom at the location at 430 King's Road until December 1970. In May 1971, the lease was taken by Myles and became Paradise Garage, selling Americana, with Malcolm McLaren and Vivienne Westwood selling 1950s rock and roll records from a backroom, before McLaren took over the shop in November 1971 and renamed it Let it Rock.

Roberts moved Mr Freedom to a new location, at Kensington Church Street. The store sold Pop art furniture in addition to clothes, by designer Jon Weallans, who designed such items as a chair in the form of a pair of false teeth. Mr Freedom added a small restaurant to its basement in 1971, called Mr Feed'em. The interior design was noted in the media as a fascinating draw for the public: "Stylistically, it defies analysis. It is almost impossible to detect at what point the patient, period reconstructions shade into pastiche". It was noted at that time, that the restaurant was relatively expensive.

Roberts closed the Mr Freedom boutique in 1972. In 1973, he opened the shop City Lights as a high-end tailor, and pursued other design projects during the 1970s. The kitsch and irony apparent in Mr Freedom's fashions had a lasting impact, not only on street fashion but even on Parisian couture designers.

== See also ==
- Carnaby Street
- Granny Takes a Trip
- King's Road
- Mary Quant
- Paul Smith (fashion designer)
