= Hapshash and the Coloured Coat =

British psychedelic rock band

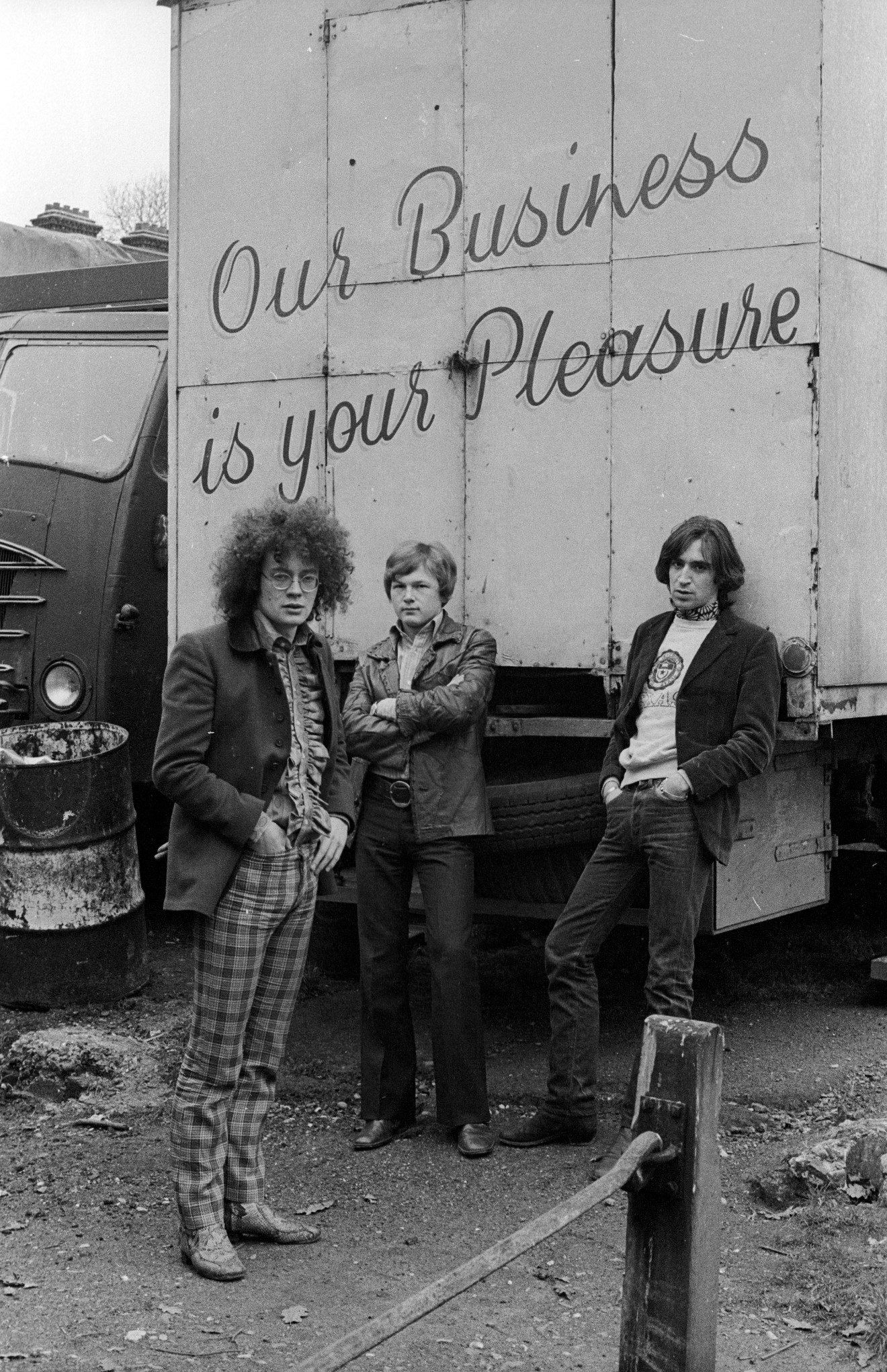

Background information
- Origin: London, England
- Genres: Psychedelic rock
- Years active: 1967–1969
- Labels: Minit, Liberty
- Past members: Michael English; Nigel Waymouth; Guy Stevens; Amanda Lear; Brian Jones; Mike Harrison; Greg Ridley; Mike Kellie; Luther Grosvenor; Tony McPhee; Mike Batt; Mickey Finn; Andy Renton; Tim Renton; Michael Mayhew; Eddie Tripp; Freddie Ballerini; Michael Ramsden; Barry Husband; John Carr

Hapshash and the Coloured Coat was an influential British graphic design and avant-garde musical partnership in the late 1960s, consisting of Michael English and Nigel Waymouth. It produced popular psychedelic posters, and two albums.

Their first album "Featuring the Human Host and the Heavy Metal Kids" (1967), produced by Guy Stevens and a collective in early 1967 is now seen as being influential on the early works of Amon Düül and other pioneers of German krautrock, as well as inspiring sections of the Rolling Stones' Their Satanic Majesties Request and being the first recorded use of "heavy metal" in relation to music as inspired by William S. Burroughs' 1961 novel The Soft Machine which includes a character known as "Uranian Willy, the Heavy Metal Kid".

The silkscreen printed posters created by the pair advertised underground "happenings", clubs and concerts in London, and became so popular at the time that they helped launch the commercial sale of posters as art, initially in fashionable stores such as the Indica Bookshop and Carnaby Street boutiques. Their posters remain highly sought after. The original artwork for a poster advertising Jimi Hendrix's 1967 concert at the Fillmore Auditorium in San Francisco – depicting the guitarist as a psychedelic Native American chief with a hunting bow in one hand and a peace pipe in the other – was sold in 2008 by Bonhams for $72,000. Between October 2000 and January 2001, the Victoria and Albert Museum, which owns the originals of many of their posters in its permanent collection, mounted a retrospective exhibition of their work titled "Cosmic Visions–Psychedelic Posters from the 1960s".

== Partnership ==
Michael English had studied art under Roy Ascott at Ealing Art College in West London between 1963 and 1966. He took part in Ascott's revolutionary Groundcourse, the first year of which focused on changing preconceptions and involved exercises such as students being subjected to continuous pulses of light and darkness in the lecture theatre before being asked to walk over a floor covered with glass marbles. Ascott later recalled that one of the aims was to create disorientation "within an environment that is sometimes unexpectedly confusing, where [the artist] is faced with problems that seem absurd, aimless or terrifying ... Pete Townshend sat on a trolley for three weeks, because he wasn't allowed to use his legs and [Brian] Eno went around with a bag on his head."

After graduating, English briefly worked for an advertising agency. Having become "captivated by the pop movement", however, he was soon selling his pop art designs – described as "a potent mix of art nouveau with hard-edge sci-fi applied to disposable items such as union flag sunglasses" – direct to London's trendy boutiques, including Gear on Carnaby Street. As a freelance graphic artist he was also producing artwork for the counterculture newspaper International Times.

Nigel Waymouth had graduated from University College London, where he studied Economic History, and had also studied art at several London colleges. Following a period working as a freelance journalist, he opened a boutique at 488 King's Road, Chelsea, in partnership with his girlfriend Sheila Cohen and John Pearse, a Savile Row–trained tailor. They acquired the premises in December 1965 and opened as Granny Takes a Trip (GTT) in February 1966, initially selling Edwardian and antique clothes with what author Paul Gorman describes as "an up-to-date feel that appealed to the young hippie denizens of what was becoming known as Swinging London". They also sold their own designs – "very decadent, flowery and over the top, but without being totally tasteless" – which were soon in demand with bands such as the Beatles (photographed wearing GTT clothes on the back cover of Revolver), the Rolling Stones (front cover of Between the Buttons), Cream, The Animals and Pink Floyd.

In December 1966 English and Waymouth were introduced to one another by Joe Boyd and John "Hoppy" Hopkins, co-founders of the UFO Club on Tottenham Court Road, who asked them to collaborate on posters advertising the club. Waymouth said: "They wanted a distinctive style. The idea was to pair us off and see what happened." The pair worked well together, with Waymouth saying "The chemistry between us was brilliant", and English describing how their combined talents "created a very interesting melange of visual delights". At first they operated under the name Cosmic Colors, but only produced one poster before changing the name to Jacob and the Coloured Coat, producing two more works. In March 1967 they chose the name Hapshash and the Coloured Coat, which suggested both hashish and psychedelic patterning (Joseph's "coat of many colors"). They set up a small studio on Princedale Road in Holland Park, close to the Oz offices, and where, according to the magazine's editor Richard Neville, "their sole inspiration was LSD and their regular 'tripping partner' was Pete Townshend." The posters were then printed and distributed by Osiris Visions, owned by the International Times, in the basement of the Indica Bookshop in Mason's Yard (off Duke Street), St. James's.

== Art ==
The posters they designed for the UFO Club and Oz magazine drew on elements of Mucha, Ernst, Magritte, Bosch, Blake, and Dulac, pulling them together in a style that art critic George Melly called "Nouveau Art Nouveau" and Time was beginning to call "Nouveau Frisco". They also designed posters for the Middle Earth club, Pink Floyd (who were the resident band at the UFO), The 5th Dimension, The Move, The Crazy World of Arthur Brown, Soft Machine, and the Incredible String Band.

While other designers at the time opted for "an indiscriminate use of rainbows and any clashing colour combination, [Hapshash] strived for maximum colour effect without sacrificing balance or harmony", and frequently used expensive gold and silver metallic inks, which previously were rarely seen on advertising posters. They also introduced a new technique to screen-printing which allowed them to "graduate from one colour to another on a single separation".

Poster for Pink Floyd at the CIA-UFO club, 28 July 1967, by Hapshash and the Coloured Coat

Their work has been cited as an inspiration by surrealistic artist Mark Wilkinson, known for his designs for bands such as Marillion, Judas Priest, and Iron Maiden.

== Music ==
They also released two albums, Featuring the Human Host and the Heavy Metal Kids (Minit: MLS 40001) in 1967, and Western Flier (Liberty: LBS 83212) in 1969. The first of these was issued on red vinyl, and the second one, Western Flier, was made in collaboration with Liberty producer and co-writer Mike Batt, who nominally became the third member of the band at that time (see featured photo of Weymouth, Batt and Mayhew).

Peter Doggett of Record Collector describes the song "The Wall" as "an agreeably ridiculous piece of pomp-pop", deeming this discovery to be a surprise when reviewing the 1994 compilation Gutbucket (on which it features), containing late 1960s English underground rock from the Liberty and United Artists labels.

== Discography ==
=== Albums ===
- Featuring the Human Host and the Heavy Metal Kids (1967)
- Western Flier (1969)

=== Singles ===
- "Colinda" (1969)

== See also ==
- Martin Sharp
- Granny Takes a Trip
