= Topman =

British clothing retailer

- Logo since 2018

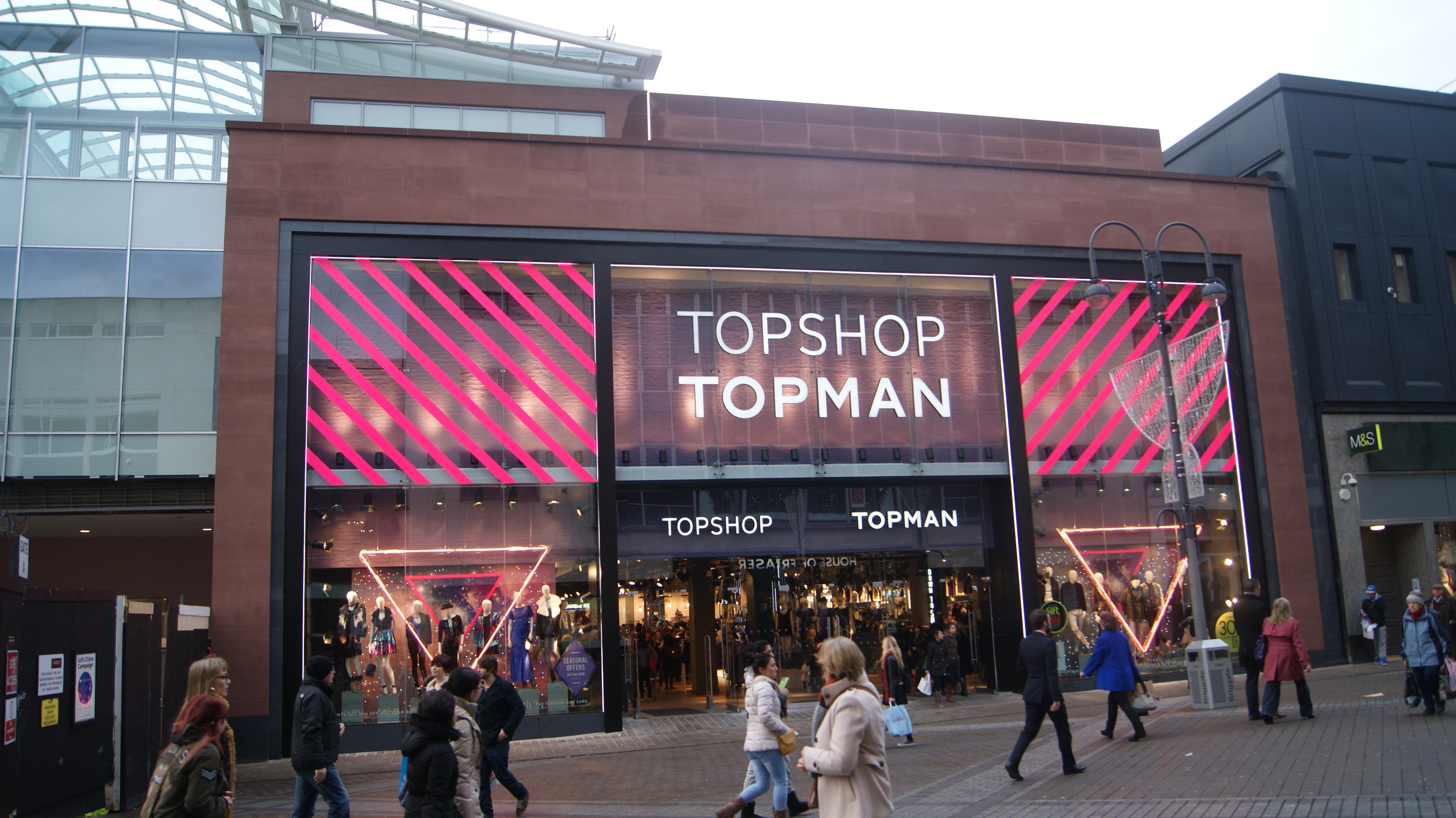
- The former flagship Topshop and Topman store in Leeds, December 2012
- Type: Subsidiary
- Industry: Fashion; Clothing; Textiles
- Genre: Retail
- Founded: 1978; 48 years ago
- Defunct: 2021
- Fate: Converted into an online store
- Headquarters: London, England
- Products: Men's fashion
- Revenue: ▲£1.8 billion
- Net income: ▼£357.5 million
- Owner: Bestseller A/S (75%); ASOS (25%)
- Website: topshop.com/gb/topman

Topman (stylised in all caps) is a British online fast-fashion retailer, which specialises in men's clothing, shoes and accessories. Since 2024, it is majority owned by Danish company Bestseller and part owned by ASOS.

Along with its women's clothing counterpart Topshop and the rest of Arcadia Group, Topman went into administration in late 2020. All high street stores subsequently closed and the brand was purchased by ASOS on 1 February 2021, relaunching as an online-only retailer.

== History ==
It was founded by Burton Group (later renamed Arcadia Group) in 1978.

In 2001, Topman's brand director, David Shepherd, was considered to have "done a Ratner" when he referred to his core clientele as "Football hooligans or whatever" and said that "Very few of our customers have to wear suits to work. They'll be for his first interview or court case".

In May 2019, the BBC and The Wall Street Journal both reported that, after its parent company Arcadia Group filed for bankruptcy, Topshop would close all 11 of its U.S. stores, including Topman. Apparel would be distributed digitally and through other wholesale partners, such as Nordstrom.

In the UK, Arcadia Group went into administration at 8pm GMT on 30 November 2020. On 25 January 2021, ASOS said it was in "exclusive" talks to buy Arcadia's Topshop, Topman, Miss Selfridge and HIIT brands out of administration, though it only wanted the brands, not the shops. A consortium including Next had earlier dropped a bid to buy Topshop and Topman; interest in Arcadia operations had also been expressed by Mike Ashley's Frasers Group, a consortium including JD Sports, and online retailer Boohoo.

On 1 February 2021, ASOS announced it had acquired the four Arcadia brands out of administration for £265 million, paying an additional £65 million for current and pre-ordered stock. ASOS will keep 300 employees on as part of the deal but will not keep any of the brands' 70 stores, putting 2,500 jobs at risk.

On the 5 September 2024, ASOS announced that it sold a 75% stake of Topshop & Topman to the Danish company Bestseller. It was announced that the Topshop and Topman websites would relaunch within 6 months of the deal, and hinted that the brands could return to the high street with stores. The chief executive of ASOS commented "We might open stores. We will consider it for sure but we have no specific agreement to open a certain number".

Through a national partnership from February 2026, Topshop will be available in 32 John Lewis stores while Topman will be on offer in six, and the brand will also be available on the John Lewis website.

== Products ==
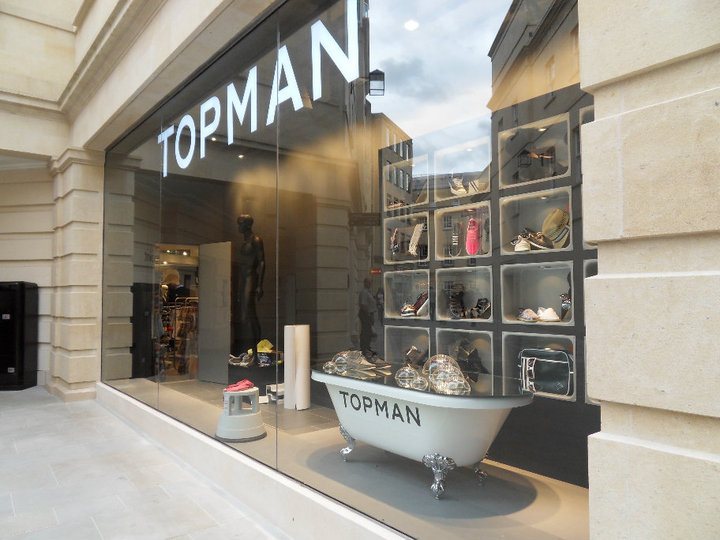
Topman SouthGate, Bath

Topman was nominated for the 'Menswear Design of the Year' award by the British Fashion Council, winner of 'Best Fashion Retailer' at the Maxim Style Awards for 2005 and winner of 'Best High Street Retailer' at the 2007 FHM Fashion and Grooming awards.

In 2008, Topman collaborated with new label The Look Presents, the creation of rock-fashion author Paul Gorman and Soho boutique owner, Max Karie, to launch 'the Look Presents'.

In 2011, Topman worked closely with Teenage Cancer Trust. The company worked in collaboration with children from the charity to produce a range of sunglasses designed by them whilst supporting the 'Rock your Shades' campaign in May 2011.
