= Hung On You =

London fashion boutique

Coordinates: 51.490697°N 0.166885°W

- Industry: fashion
- Headquarters: London, England
- Key people: Michael Rainey; Michael English
- Products: Flowery shirts Kipper ties

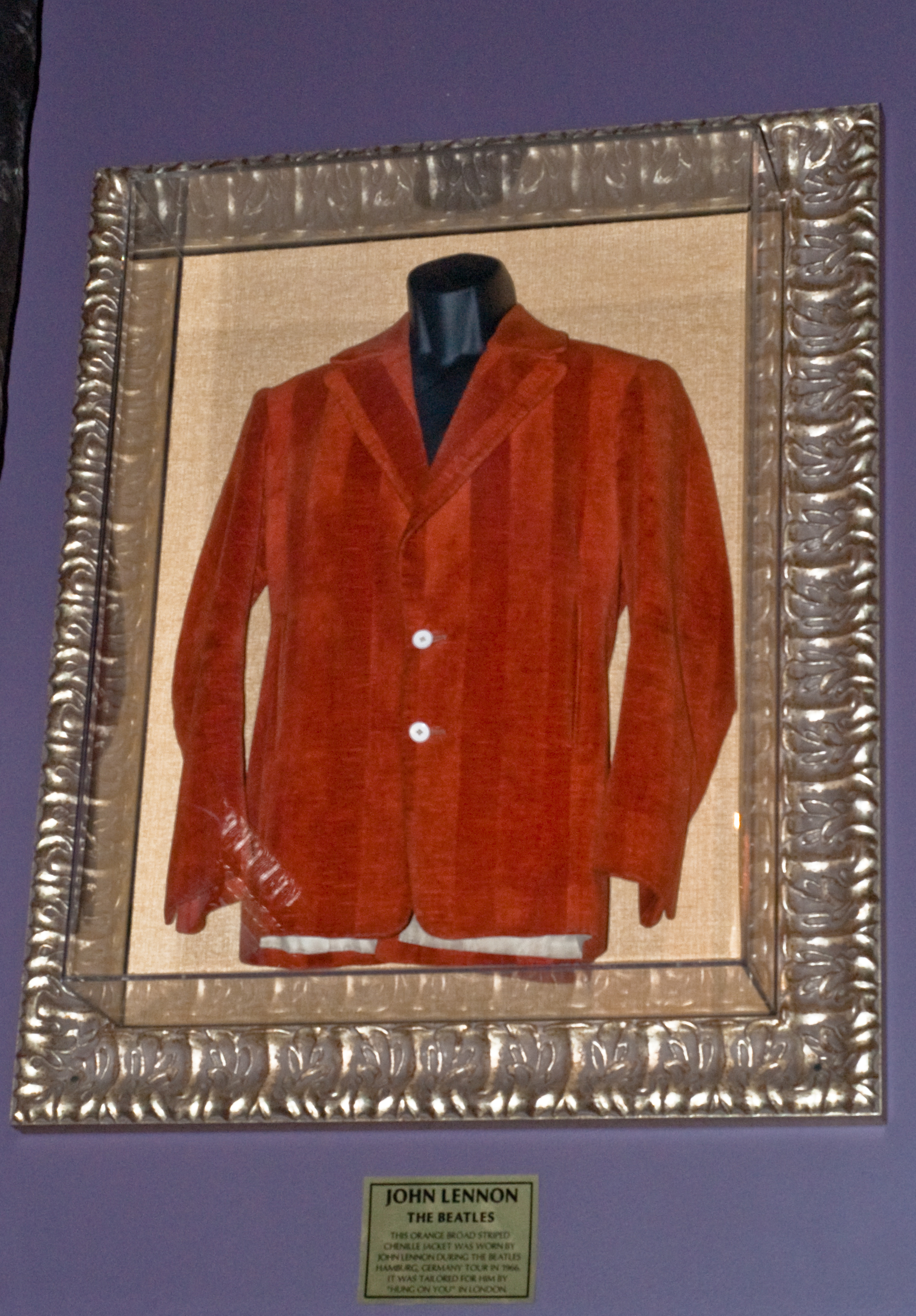
Hung On You jacket tailored for John Lennon and worn by him during the Beatles Hamburg, Germany Tour, 1966

Hung On You was a London fashion boutique, run by the designer Michael Rainey, particularly known for flowery shirts and kipper ties in bold colours. Rainey's customers included the Rolling Stones, The Beatles, The Kinks and the actor Terence Stamp.

The shop opened at 22 Cale Street, London, with a mural by Michael English. It later relocated to 430 King's Road, Chelsea.

Regular customers included Sir Mark Palmer, and the models from his male modelling agency English Boy. Rainey sold the lease to the boutique in 1969 to Tommy Roberts and Trevor Myles, and it became Mr Freedom.

His then wife, Jane Ormsby Gore, in a 2006 interview with the Victoria & Albert Museum, said: "Michael made the most gigantic mistake of leaving Cale Street and going onto the King's Road. He felt that it was happening on the King's Road, but it cost a lot of money to move, and people didn't know where we were. It became less successful then. Before it was slightly more slick, with a big jardinière mirrored thing in the middle of the shop. We had got two children by then, and we were seriously into soul seeking and going on fasts and meditating… We left London, sold everything, gave away everything, and went to live in Gozo. London times and everything were over."

== See also ==
- Swinging London
