= Gene Krell =

- Occupations: fashion entrepreneur, designer, and journalist
- Spouse: Naoko Inagaki
- Writing career
- Years active: 1967 - Present
- Subject: Fashion

Gene Krell is an American fashion entrepreneur, designer, and journalist. Krell is the international fashion director for the Japanese editions of Vogue and GQ, the creative director for the Korean editions of Vogue, Vogue Girl, and W, as well as a creative consultant to Allure and GQ Korea.

Krell was raised in Brownsville, Brooklyn, New York.

In 1969, Freddie Hornik, Krell and Marty Breslau took over the legendary boutique Granny Takes a Trip and together they expanded the business, adding shops in New York and Los Angeles.

After leaving Granny's, Krell worked with Vivienne Westwood, becoming Westwood's "right-hand man". Krell credits Westwood with getting him off heroin.

Krell lives in Tokyo with his wife, the merchandise display artist Naoko Inagaki.
