= San Lorenzo (restaurant) =

Defunct restaurant in London

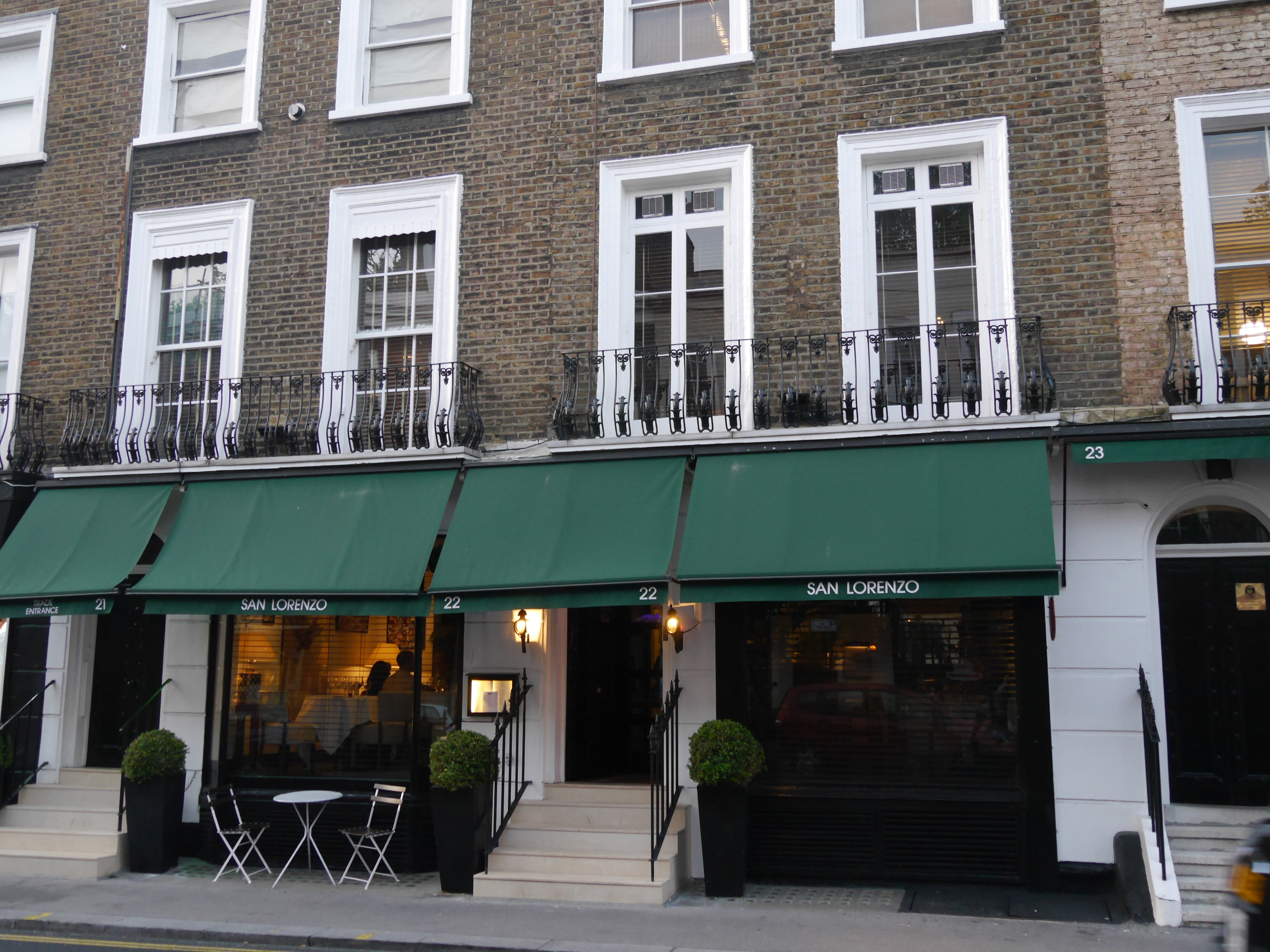
- San Lorenzo in 2016

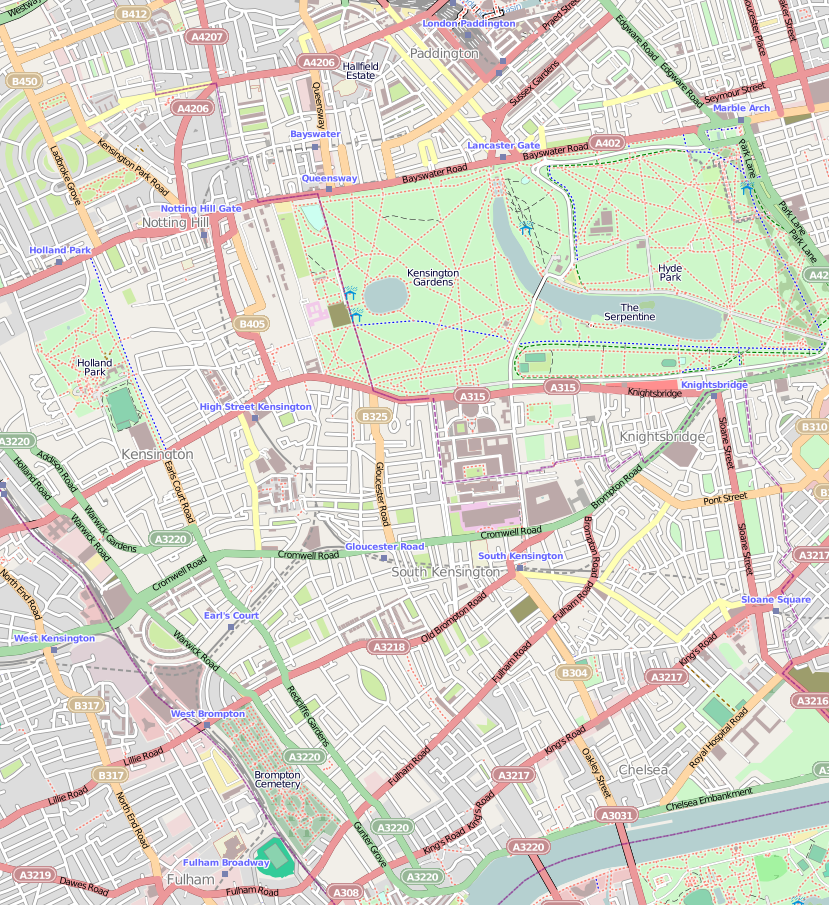
- Location in Knightsbridge, London

Restaurant information
- Established: 1963 (63 years ago) as Osteria San Lorenzo
- Closed: 2022 (4 years ago)
- Owners: Mara and Lorenzo Berni
- Food type: Italian cuisine
- Location: 22 Beauchamp Place, Knightsbridge, London, England, U.K.
- Coordinates: 51°29′51″N 0°9′52″W

San Lorenzo was an Italian restaurant located at 22 Beauchamp Place in Knightsbridge, London.

The restaurant opened in 1963 and soon became known for its northern Italian cuisine and attracted many celebrities and influential diners. The heyday of the restaurant was in the 1980s and 1990s before its closure in 2022.

San Lorenzo was a favourite restaurant of Diana, Princess of Wales, who became close with Mara Berni, who had established the restaurant with her husband Lorenzo.

== History and operations ==
Lorenzo Berni, an Italian steward on cruise ships and former partisan, arrived in London in 1960 following the sinking of his Norwegian merchant ship. He found work behind the bar of a pub in Soho before becoming the manager of La Taverna Spaghetti Garden in Kensington Grove. He married Maria "Mara" Theresa Lasilier less than a year later. The couple subsequently had three children, Paulo, Gigio and Marina.

The Bernis opened the restaurant on Beauchamp Place in Knightsbridge on 17 October 1963 calling it Osteria San Lorenzo. The couple had saved £1,000 and borrowed £1,500 (equivalent to £27,398 in 2025) from a sympathetic bank manager who had been a patron of the Spaghetti Garden. The fourteen-year lease on the building cost £4 a week.

Other customers who were architects offered to draw up plans and apply for planning permission for the couple. The restaurant was designed with the kitchen at the front of the establishment to replicate the design of a traditional Italian trattoria which enabled guests to be seated al fresco at the back of the restaurant. It initially seated nine diners.

The wife of the London correspondent of Corriere della Sera, Mercedes Rizzini, was walking along Beauchamp Place the day after San Lorenzo opened when she smelt garlic, then an unusual scent in 1960s Knightsbridge. She entered the restaurant to find Mara Berni cooking risotto, which she then ate, "enjoyed immensely" and bought her husband to dine there the next day. The couple spread the word about the new establishment over the next few weeks.

The Bernis would wear butcher's aprons when serving their guests in the early days of the restaurant. A tree grew in the middle of the restaurant and guests ate at long communal tables covered with wipe-clean tablecloths.

The food was from the Tuscan and Piedmontese regions in contrast to the dominant Neapolitan cuisine of emerging Italian restaurants in London and was based on family recipes the couple had inherited. Lorenzo Berni was from Forte dei Marmi and sought to replicate the seafood of his childhood.

In December 1967, The Guardian recommended the "chic basement" of San Lorenzo as being "not too expensive". The restaurant had no alcohol licence in the early days and customers could bring their own wine or ask Lorenzo Berni to go to a nearby pub for them.

A sycamore tree grew in the courtyard of the restaurant. When it died it was carved into a sculpture Labyrinth by Joe Tilson. It was named for the labyrinthine layout of the early restaurant.

The basement was the most socially advantageous place to be seated. The best table to be seen at was the first table on the left of the stairs in the basement. To be seated in the balcony overlooking the bar was "tantamount to a social death announcement, SW3 style" according to the writer William Cash.

The decor was described as a cross between "a rather grand Thirties ocean liner, and a sunny Italian family restaurant". Favoured diners would receive a special panettone at Christmas and a silver San Lorenzo engraved matchbox. Photographs of children of diners were displayed in the cloakroom area.

Lorenzo and Mara Berni were eventually appointed to the Italian Order of Merit for Labour.

Mara Berni would inquire after diners' astrological signs and attempt to divine their fortunes through her supposed psychic abilities. Saying in 1988 that she would " ... worry about people, I am intuitive and I look at their stars".

Bernis' daughter, Marina, took over the restaurant upon her mother's death in 2012. Marina described the evolution of dietary habits in 2016 by describing diners as "... [ordering] far fewer desserts, and if they do, they tend to share. They rarely ask for butter, and they definitely drink less". She also said that prosecco was more popular than champagne and that the traditional rule of not drinking red wine with fish was no longer followed. Lorenzo Berni had long sought to promote prosecco over champagne.

In 1986, the restaurant was decorated by Sasha Gebler, the son of the novelist Edna O'Brien. Artworks displayed in the restaurant in 1988 included "Babe Rainbow" by Peter Blake and an Andy Warhol painting from his Marilyn Monroe portfolio. The paintings of Jonathan Routh also decorated the restaurant.

The heyday of the restaurant was the 1980s and 1990s. By the 2010s, it was perceived as outdated. In 1990, the restaurant expanded into the adjacent building. A shop was also opened, selling Italian produce.

In 2016, San Lorenzo was named by HM Revenue and Customs as having underpaid thirty staff by almost £100,000, having used tips from customers to subsidize their wages. Lorenzo Berni was also expected to be fined almost £200,000. It was the worst company in Britain for paying staff less than the National Living Wage that year.

San Lorenzo only accepted payment in cash and credit cards were not accepted. William Cash wrote that only accepting cash "[kept] out the tourists and expense-account lowlifes". Mara Berni claimed that the refusal to take cards was due to her umbrage at having been rejected by Diners Club shortly after the restaurant opened.

In 2016, the restaurant was closed for renovations for several months and reopened in November of that year. San Lorenzo closed in 2022 as a result of the economic fallout of the COVID-19 pandemic in London. In July 2025, the building was occupied by squatters who described themselves as "a collective of individuals in a state of homelessness".

In 1971, a sister branch was opened in Wimbledon in south west London called San Lorenzo Fuoriporta.

== Notable patrons ==
A 2003 profile described San Lorenzo as "London's celebrity canteen" with "Rock legends and movie stars, playboys and supermodels, sporting heroes and royals".

The Genoese Consul, Count Paolo Valfre' di Bonzo brought actress Sophia Loren to dine in 1963 while she was filming in London. Loren also visited San Lorenzo while making her 1967 film A Countess from Hong Kong. She dined with twelve men seated on a long table and the ensuing publicity made the restaurant's reputation.

Quentin Crewe claimed to have seen the Italian ambassador to the Court of St James's at the restaurant in the mid 1960s. Mara Berni recalled the ambassador as regularly visiting with his mistress as well with his wife and six children. On one occasion, his mistress's false eyelashes fell into her soup, which she promptly ate.

Peter Sellers and Britt Ekland were early celebrity patrons of San Lorenzo and brought Princess Margaret and Lord Snowdon to dine there. The model Jill Kennington recalled seeing Michelangelo Antonioni in the restaurant as he was preparing to make Blowup. Lorenzo Berni believed that the cinematic styles of the Italian film directors who ate at San Lorenzo were reflected in their eating habits. Berni described Antonioni who made "very complicated films" as eating "little complicated food ...chopped up small"; Federico Fellini whose films were "big and lucious and strong" would have pasta and a T-bone steak, Francesco Rosi who was "very much of the left ... looked at his food as if he didn't care" and Luchino Visconti "the perfectionist" would always have an "aperitif, then starter, first course, second course, sweet coffee, liqueur ... all perfectly organised like his films".

San Lorenzo was also favoured by the Italian football managers Luca Vialli and Fabio Capello. Twiggy celebrated her 21st birthday at the restaurant. The tennis player Boris Becker would always order tagliata di manzo (rare sliced fillet with rocket and mashed potatoes) the evening before his Wimbledon Championships finals matches. Gianluca Vialli asked Lorenzo Berni why there was a pasta dish dedicated to Toto Schillaci, to which Berni said that if he scored against Manchester United he would name one for him, and he subsequently did, creating Penne alia Vialli. A "random Monday night" in 2003 saw the restaurant host Matthew and Tamara Mellon, Jonathan Aitken, Prince Nikolaos of Greece and Denmark.

The Rolling Stones dined at San Lorenzo after their The Stones in the Park concert in 1969. The band also once rang the doorbell of the restaurant demanding food at 3am following a recording session. Roberto Calvi ate his last meal at San Lorenzo before his murder 17 June 1982.

An October 1988 lunchtime saw businessman Gordon White at a corner table "surrounded by pretty girls", Bruce Oldfield, Michael Roberts and Manolo Blahnik dined together with Rifat Ozbek and the fashion designer Nadia la Valle of Spaghetti.

=== Diana, Princess of Wales ===
Princess Margaret, Countess of Snowdon told Diana, Princess of Wales about San Lorenzo. In the early 1990s Mara Berni approached Diana to tell her how unhappy she looked despite such rumours of Diana and Prince Charles's marital strife being widely unknown. Diana's biographer Andrew Morton wrote that Berni "painted a portrait of Diana's lonely, sorrowful life" and Diana was impressed by the accuracy of Berni's observations and her perception regarding her future. Biographer James Whitaker described Berni as a "motherly figure whose symphathetic personality ... encouraged the rich and famous to bear their souls to her". Berni would also give Diana tarot card readings. In the aftermath of her estrangement from Charles, Diana would bring her paramours there including James Hewitt and Oliver Hoare. Mara Berni would let Diana use her nearby flat in Walton Street for her romantic assignations.

After the departure of James Hewitt, Diana would dine at San Lorenzo with what her biographer Tina Brown described as a "praetorian guard of distracting flirts". The group included Phillip Dunne, army officers David Waterhouse and Rory Scott and James Gilbey. Berni is mentioned by Diana and Gilbey on the "Squidgygate" tapes of their intercepted telephone call. Diana and her paramours were protected by Berni's discretion. Berni permitted Diana to use the restaurant as a dead letter drop so people could write to her without their post being intercepted by Kensington Palace staff.

Diana would sit at the back of the downstairs area on the left, where a palm tree would hide her from view. She would also dine there with her sons Prince William and Prince Harry. As a child, William would make reservations at San Lorenzo for his mother to cheer her up after arguments with Charles. The actor Terrance Stamp became friends with Diana after meeting her when dining with her sons at the restaurant.

Paparazzi photographers following Diana would sit on the opposite side of the street to San Lorenzo while waiting for her, eating falafel wraps in the Moroccoan restaurant Maroush. Diana also used the restaurant to meet journalists. Anthony Holden recalled being told to come to San Lorenzo and being seated next to an empty table with flowers which was promptly occupied by Diana and William and Harry and their nanny. Diana then invited Holden to lunch with them and gave him off-the-record messages.

Diana's butler Paul Burrell held a celebratory dinner at San Lorenzo after receiving the Royal Victorian Medal from Queen Elizabeth II in 1997. Mara Berni's obituary in The Times wrote that she and Diana "fell out" before Diana's death.

== Reception ==
Early dishes at the restaurant included pigeon with polenta and sea bass which was then considered a rarity in Britain. Eighteen months after San Lorenzo opened Quentin Crewe wrote in Queen magazine that "No one before had so perfectly created in London the kind of backstreet trattoria that you would find in every Italian town".

"Mario", a former chef at San Lorenzo, opened his restaurant 13 1/2 on Beauchamp Place in 1969. A 1969 review of 13 1/2 by Beryl Hartland in the Daily Telegraph described Mario as having made San Lorenzo the "top place for splendid peasant Italian food".

The 1992 entry for San Lorenzo in the Harden's restaurant guide described it as a "passé Knightsbridge trattoria, popular with celebs and royalty".

A 1997 review by David Fingleton for The Spectator on the "overpriced restaurants" of Quaglino's, Daphne's, Langan's Brasserie and San Lorenzo concluded that at San Lorenzo it was a "pleasure to sit there, service was attentive, cooking correct, and Mara clearly cares".

In a 1998 review of Floriana, another Italian restaurant on Beaucamp Place, A.A. Gill wrote that he was saving reviewing San Lorenzo until he was "suicidally depressed" as it was "all things considered, quite the worst restaurant in London, maybe the world". Gill wrote that the popularity of San Lorenzo proved F. Scott Fitzgerald's "first law of society" that "the rich and famous really are different". Gill wrote that San Lorenzo served "horrendous food, grudgingly, in a dining room that is a museum to Italian waiters' taste circa 1976". Gill wrote that to enter the restaurant "you have to be kissed by a woman called Mara, who must surely have been around to do tongues with Garibaldi" before being led into the dining room to view the "collection of poseurs, pimps, phoney counts, lounge lizards, poodle fakers, ageing gigolos and remittance men who have all been bussed ahead of you. And it makes you feel faint with queasiness".

A 2007 review in The Daily Telegraph by Mark Palmer concluded that it was "Frankly ... not good enough. With a modest tip, we leave paying more than pounds 60 a head for sub-standard Italian fare in a 1980s - style Knightsbridge basement - and not a celebrity in sight" and that the menu was "far too long" with 25 starters and 29 main courses.

Simon Mills wrote upon its closure that "The final grissini breadstick has been un-sheafed, the last pap bulb flashed. It is the end of an era and a pasta primavera". Social commentator Peter York commented that the heyday of San Lorenzo was the time of "Nigel Dempster, of Dai Llewellyn, floppy-haired, modelising playboys, open-neck-shirted Euros and Mayfair Mercenary types in Piero di Monzi jeans and horizontally striped, silver fox furs". Harden's described the food as "not really the point" of the restaurant due to its social importance.

Toby Young felt that the secret to the restaurants enduring success was that the international jet set "[didn't] know any better" and that "Celebrities are like sheep: they only want to go where other celebrities go and, in the absence of any more reliable information, San Lorenzo is a pretty safe bet".

Jonathan Meades described the patrons in 1994 as "Arms dealers, horizontals, rock legends, educationally subnormal royals, ladies who lunch, rag trade morons, ladies who shop, actors, supermodels. This Is a holy site for International White Trash. If you have not appeared in Hello! you might as well forget It since the charmless staff will do their utmost to ignore you. The cooking is not the point of the place — which is just as well".

== See also ==
- List of Italian restaurants
- List of restaurants in London
