= 190 New King's Road =

18th-century house in Fulham, London, England

Coordinates: 51.470152°N 0.208398°W

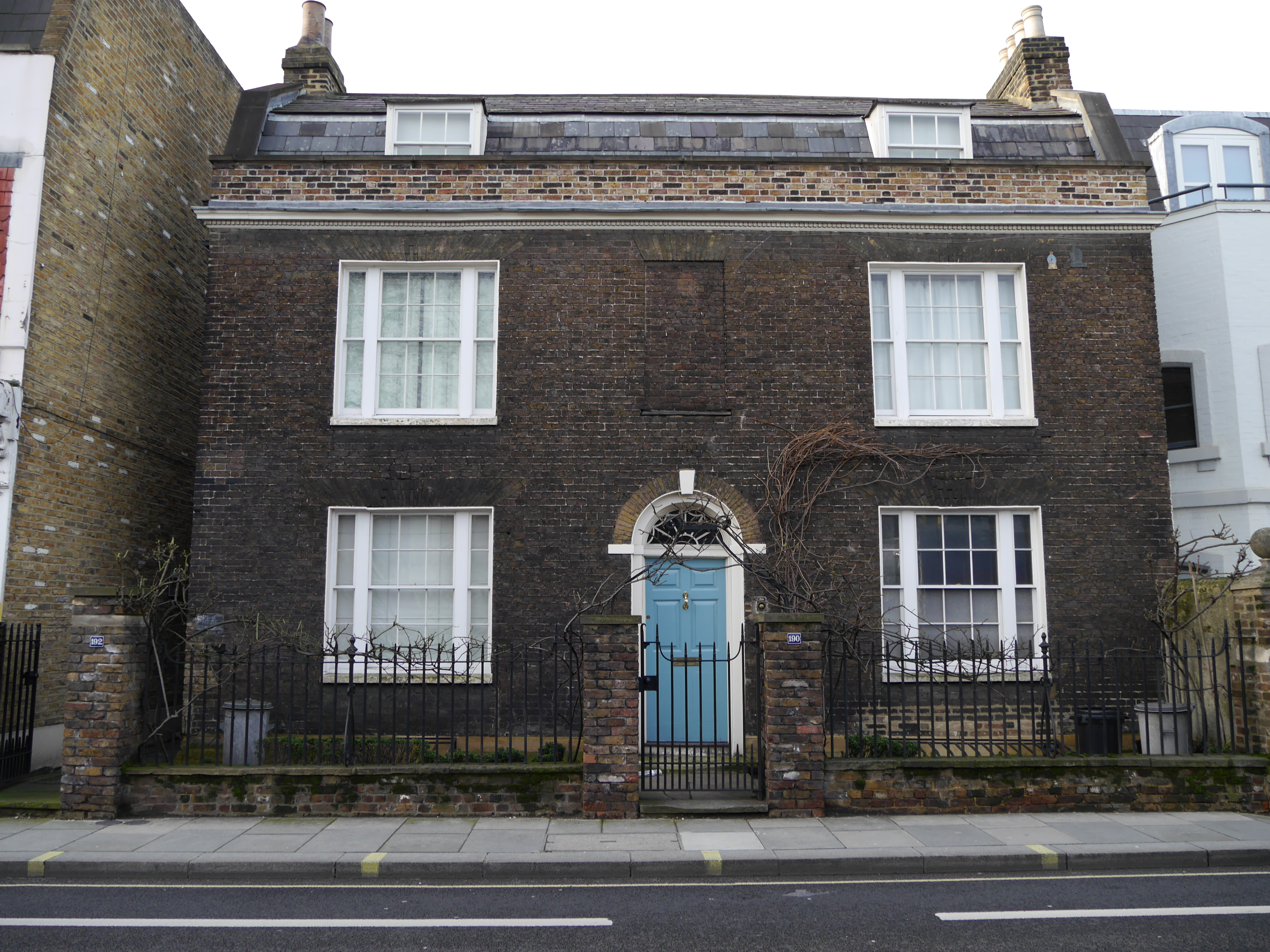
190 New King's Road, Fulham, London

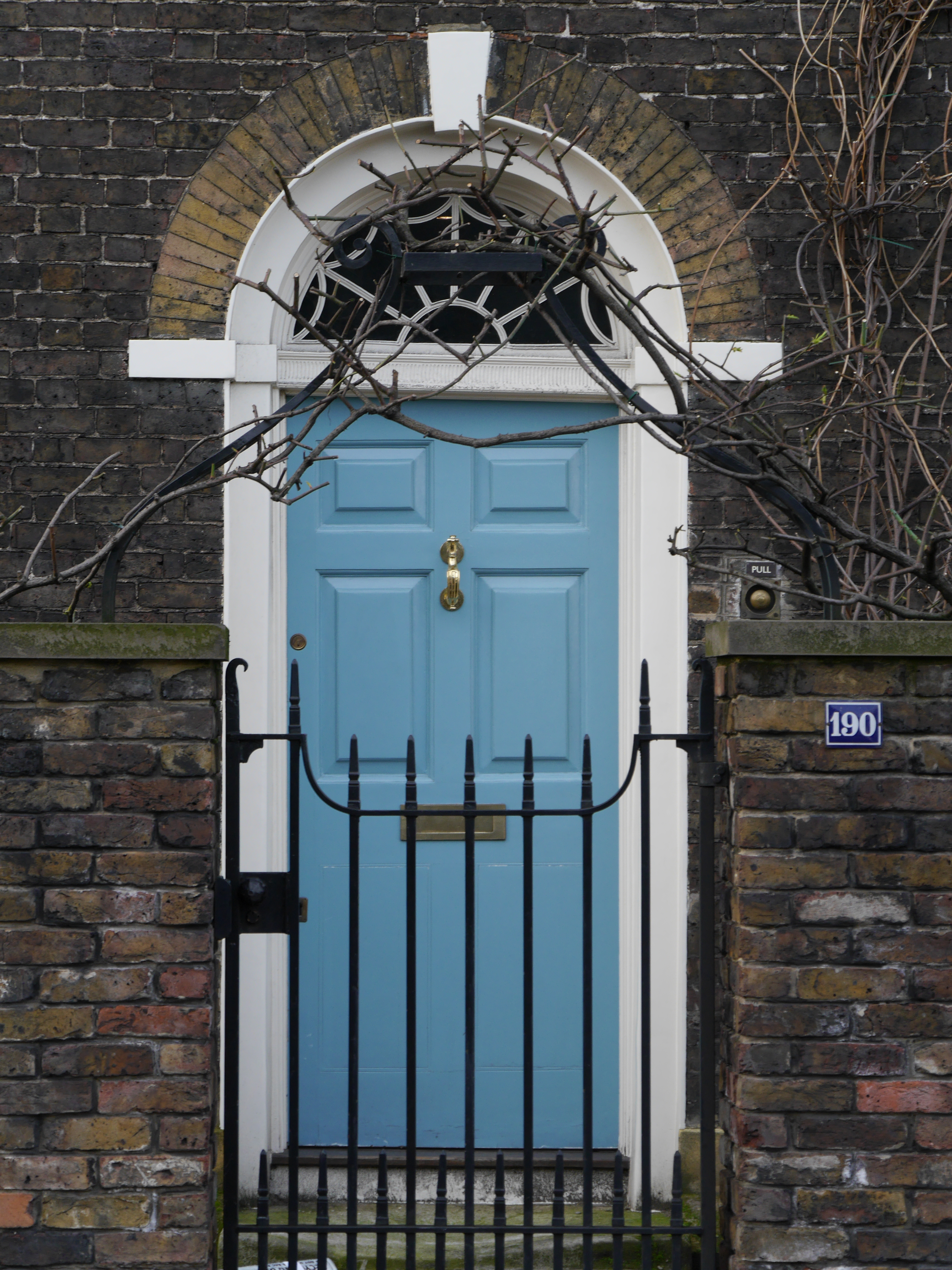
Doorway detail

190 New King's Road, also known as Jasmine House, is a Grade II listed house on New King's Road, Fulham, London, built in the late 18th century.

It is mentioned by Pevsner as a "late Georgian detached villa, with pretty enriched cornice and doorcase."
