= The Look: Adventures In Rock & Pop Fashion =

The Look: Adventures In Rock & Pop Fashion is a 2006 book by Paul Gorman about the inter-connected developments of style and popular music from Elvis Presley to the present day.

With an introduction by Paul Smith and foreword by Malcolm McLaren, The Look was hailed as "the book", by Robert Elms in The Times.

The Look was launched in Japan to coincide with the opening of Paul Smith’s flagship store, Space, in Tokyo in April 2006.

The Look includes 300-plus illustrations (many previously unseen), 120,000 words, and a CD featuring such artists as Elvis Presley, David Bowie and Boy George.

Among the contributors to the book are Jimmy Page of Led Zeppelin, Ronnie Wood of the Rolling Stones, Ian McLagan of the Small Faces, Boy George, Glen Matlock of the Sex Pistols, Kevin Rowland of Dexy’s and Nancy Sinatra as well as designers such as Malcolm McLaren, Paul Smith, Hedi Slimane, Lloyd Johnson, Alex Michon, Mark Powell, Pam Hogg and Betsey Johnson.

The Look was accompanied by events including appearances at the Port Eliot LitFest, the V&A, London College of Fashion and Central Saint Martins and also spawned a London club-night which has featured DJ sets and performances by Pam Hogg, Keanan Duffty, Glen Matlock, Kevin Rowland, The Priscillas and Poppy & the Jezebels.
