= Trevor Myles =

British fashion entrepreneur

Trevor Myles is a British former fashion entrepreneur and designer who ran the Mr Freedom boutique at 430 King's Road, Chelsea, London and later in Kensington Church Street, with his business partner Tommy Roberts.
