= Keanan Duffty =

British singer and fashion designer (born 1964)

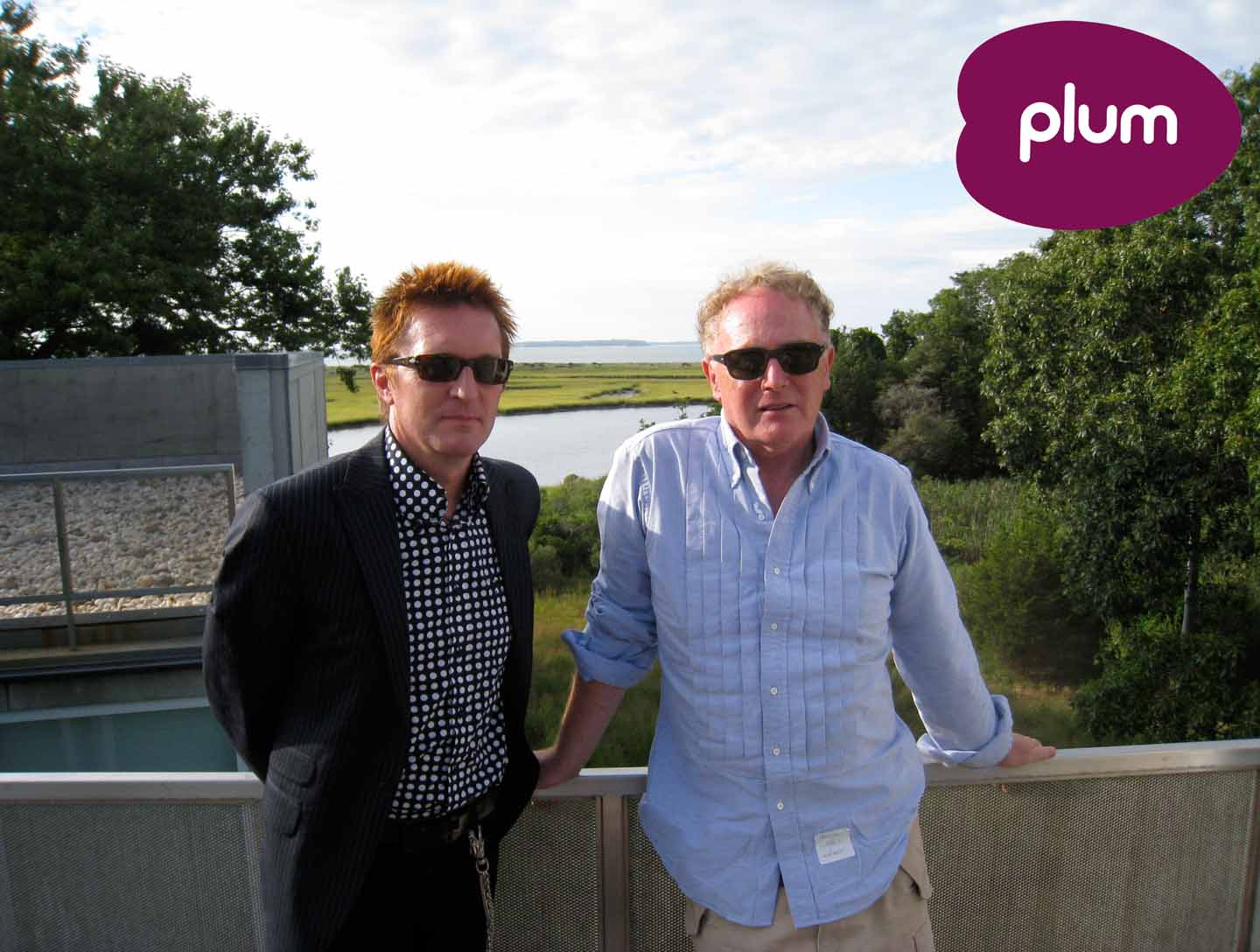
Keanan Duffty with punk impresario Malcolm McLaren.

Keanan Duffty (born 28 April 1964) is a British fashion designer and musician based in New York City. Duffty studied fashion design at Saint Martin's School of Art in London, and graduated with a Bachelor of Arts degree. He is a member of the Council of Fashion Designers of America, Mentor for the Master's Program in Fashion Styling at Polimoda and Program Director at the Master’s of Professional Studies in Fashion Management at Parsons School of Design.

== Early years ==
Duffty was a founding member of the British Punk band Sordid Details with Martin Beard (Drums), Jonathan Cameron (vocals) and Dave Huzzard (Bass). Formed in 1978 in the North of England Sordid Details were influenced by the Sex Pistols, for whom Duffty would later design stage clothes.

In 1980, Duffty formed Wonder Stories, a New Romantic group which gained support from Radio 1 DJ Peter Powell and reviews in the Sounds music paper. Wonder Stories performed live in 1980 and 1981, however by 1982 Duffty moved to London to study fashion design at St Martin's School of Art. Duffty worked at PX, the London New Romantic boutique where Visage vocalist Steve Strange had also worked.

Duffty was discovered by music business insider Falcon Stuart, former manager of Adam and the Ants, and X Ray Spex. Stuart arranged for Duffty to record demos for EMI and MCA records, eventually releasing a 12" dance mix of Water Sport on Falcon Stuart's Awesome Records label (AOR4) in 1985. Duffty recorded a four song session at Maida Vale Studios for BBC Radio 1 DJ Janice Long. Water Sport was record of the week in Smash Hits, reviewed in the NME by Dylan Jones and became a club hit in the UK. Duffty played a number of London shows including the ID Magazine Fifth anniversary party at the Institute of Contemporary Arts.

Duffty relocated to New York in 1993 where he recorded the song I Am An Alien. The Video featured famed downtown diva Amanda Lepore as a futuristic nurse.

== Fashion ==
Duffty established his fashion label and SoHo design studio in 1999. The collection is inspired by subversive subcultures and mixes high fashion with youth culture, music and British iconography. Over 70 premium specialty retailers carried the collection from 1999–2006 including Bergdorf Goodman, Bloomingdales, Fred Segal, Lane Crawford, Harvey Nichols, Bay Crews and Journal Standard in Japan.

Duffty has a celebrity following that included David Bowie. In 2001 Duffty designed a space suit worn by Martha Stewart in a Kmart commercial.

In 2007 Duffty collaborated with David Bowie to create a limited-edition Bowie inspired collection for Target stores nationwide.

Duffty's clothes have been featured on TV shows including American Idol, Entourage, Queer Eye for the Straight Guy, Rock Star: Supernova and several music videos. Duffty also designs the clothes for his rock band Slinky Vagabond.

In 2010 Duffty announced the return of his signature label, re-entering the market with a contemporary men's collection for spring. The collection launched with 50 pieces, including woven shirts, knits, outerwear, skinny jeans, vests, trenchcoats and band jackets. On September 10, Duffty staged a guerilla-style fashion show in New York City. The models arrived by bus and marched at Lincoln Center with protest signs displaying lyrics from songs by Kraftwerk and Adam Ant.

From 2012 to 2015 Duffty was Senior Academic Director of the Fashion Merchandising program at Academy of Art University in San Francisco. Polimoda fashion institute in Florence Italy named Duffty as their Mentor for the Masters Program in Fashion Styling, from April 2017.

== Music ==
Duffty has been lead singer in the band Slinky Vagabond, alongside Glen Matlock (Sex Pistols), Clem Burke (Blondie), and Earl Slick (David Bowie/John Lennon). Slinky Vagabond made their debut in May 2007 at Irving Plaza as part of Joey Ramone's annual birthday bash. Slinky Vagabond also performed for Gen Art during New York fashion week and at the Rock and Roll Fantasy Camp. In 2008, XS Games launched PopStar Guitar for the Wii and PlayStation 2 computer entertainment system. Songs include "Glitterbug" from Slinky Vagabond, along with tracks by Fall Out Boy, Paramore and All-American Rejects.

Duffty also performed at the Marc Bolan 30th Anniversary show at the Delacorte Theatre in September 2007 alongside Patti Smith, Scissor Sisters, Moby, Lloyd Cole and the New York Dolls. On April 18, 2008, Duffty was part of an extraordinary concert line-up featuring performances by Clem Burke, Slash, Tom Morrello, Alan Vega, Ronnie Spector, Ian Hunter, Cheetah Chrome, Joan Jett, and Handsome Dick Manitoba. The world of music and fashion fused as John Varvatos celebrated the opening of his second boutique in New York City at 315 Bowery, a space that formerly housed the seminal underground music club CBGB's.

In May 2008, Duffty was a featured performer at the Loser's Lounge tribute to the Kinks at Joe's Public Theater in New York City with Earl Slick. Duffty regularly sang at downtown New York events such as 'Bowie Ball', held bi-annually at Don Hill's club in the Village.

In December 2012, Duffty released a new album titled Killers in Glitter, a compilation of Duffty's music, from "Water Sport" (1985) to his work with Slinky Vagabond in 2007. Songs were written or co-written by Duffty with the exception of two covers: the David Bowie classic "Boys Keep Swinging" and the Bauhaus goth anthem "Bela Lugosi's Dead". Duffty can be heard covering Katy Perry, Lana Del Rey, Joy Division and Primal Scream on his most recent album Total Dragon Pop (2014) with Earl Slick producing and playing guitar.

== Television ==
Duffty's television credits include hosting The Juice in 2008 on the now defunct US network Plum TV, for which he interviewed cultural icons including Gore Vidal, Donna Karan, Tommy Hilfiger, Elvis Costello, Russell Simmons, punk impresario Malcolm McLaren, and actors Laura Dern, Courteney Cox, Alec Baldwin and Chase Crawford of Gossip Girl. Duffty has appeared as a mentor on TLC’s Faking It, and has been featured extensively on MTV, Videofashion, E! Entertainment, Sirius XM Radio and BLUE GOLD, a new documentary on the iconic blue jean.

== Rebel Rebel Anti-Style ==
In 2009, Duffty co-authored (with Paul Gorman) Rebel Rebel-Anti Style. Tracing the roots of rebel style to the music scene, the book explores how fashionable music and "anti-fashion" icons, like David Bowie, Sex Pistols, and Gwen Stefani, have inspired fashion. The book was published by Rizzoli (US) and Adelita (UK).

Duffty has given a series of "Rebel Rebel-Anti Style" lectures at fashion schools, including the Fashion Institute of Technology, Parsons The New School in New York City, Marist College, the Academy of Art San Francisco, LIM College, the New York Public Library for the Performing Arts, and the Brooklyn Museum.

== Velvet Revolver ==
In 2008, Duffty received two instrumental tracks from Sanctuary Management, the representatives of Velvet Revolver. The two demo tracks were titled 'Muthafucka' and 'Clappy'. Duffty's challenge was to write and record vocals and lyrics for these songs. Duffty went into Club House studios in Upstate New York with Earl Slick as producer. The resulting session produced new versions of the Velvet Revolver instrumentals now entitled "Fear No Evil" and "Prima Donna".

== Malcolm McLaren project ==
Malcolm McLaren: Spectacular Failure has been a documentary film project under development for a decade. Producers Keanan Duffty and Daniel Honan captured the last interview with McLaren in 2008 in Long Island, New York.
