= Reasons to Be Cheerful (book) =

Biography of graphic artist Barney Bubbles

Reasons to Be Cheerful: The Life and Work of Barney Bubbles
- Author: Paul Gorman
- Language: English
- Subject: Barney Bubbles
- Genre: Biography
- Publisher: Adelita
- Publication date: November 2008
- Publication place: United Kingdom

Reasons to Be Cheerful: The Life and Work of Barney Bubbles is a book about British graphic artist Barney Bubbles (1942 – 1983).

Written by Paul Gorman, the book incorporates an essay by Peter Saville, a foreword by Malcolm Garrett and an introduction by Billy Bragg.

It has been published in two editions by independent British imprint Adelita; the first came out in November 2008, the second in December 2010.
