= Keith Wainwright (hairdresser) =

British hairdresser (1944–2024)

Keith Wainwright MBE (13 October 1944 – 16 April 2024) was an English hairdresser.

== Early life and training ==
Keith Wainwright was born in Bermondsey, London on 13 October 1944. In 1959, Wainwright started a five-year apprenticeship, followed by a year on the Union Castle liners.

== Work ==
In 1965, he began working in London's West End for Leonard ladies salon and playing music to create a more youthful atmosphere. His clients at the time included Roy Wood, The Move, Cat Stevens, The Walker Brothers and Elton John.

In 1969, Wainwright opened a salon in Knightsbridge called "Smile" with partners Leslie Russell and Paul Owen. During the next decade he worked with chemists and hair technicians to create "unnatural" hair colours. These were later popularised by the British "punk" movement. Keith became known as "Keith at Smile."

== Albums and films ==
Wainwright was the first hairdresser to be credited on an album sleeve, with Roxy Music's self-titled debut album.

Wainwright did the hair for Derek Jarman's films Sebastiane, Jubilee, and The Tempest, where he met Toyah Willcox. He coloured and styled Willcox's hair for the next ten years. Wainwright also consulted on Malcolm McLaren's The Great Rock 'n' Roll Swindle.

In the 1980s, he styled hair for television commercials such as Brylcreem and pop promos like Cliff Richard and Debbie Harry while continuing to work at Smile. In 1984, Smile moved to Chelsea, and was mentioned in the lyrics of the Pet Shop Boys' 2012 album Elysium, on the track "Requiem in Denim and Leopardskin."

In 1989, Wainwright and Leslie Russell started Smile Management with Kim Sion. The agency began with stylists and makeup artists, and soon moved to represent fashion photographers, such as Ellen Unworth, Steve Hiett, Mert & Marcus and Mario Testino. The concern closed in 2003.

== Later life and death ==
In the 2011 New Year Honours, Wainwright was appointed Member of the Order of the British Empire (MBE) for contributions to the hairdressing industry. He died on 16 April 2024, at the age of 79.

== Sources ==
- Bracewell, Michael. Re-make/Re-model: Becoming Roxy Music, Faber & Faber, 2008. ISBN 978-0-571-22985-7
- Hislop, Kirsty, & Lutyens, Dominic. 70s Style and Design, Thames & Hudson, 2009 ISBN 978-0-500-51483-2
- Fiell, Charlotte. Hairstyles: Ancient to Present, Fiell Publishing Limited, 2012 ISBN 1906863105. ISBN 978-1906863104
- Gorman, Paul. Mr Freedom- Tommy Roberts: British Design Hero, Adelita Ltd. ISBN 0955201799, ISBN 978-0955201790
- Mulvagh, Jane. Vivienne Westwood, HarperCollins, 1998. ISBN 0-00-255625-1
