= Beauchamp Place =

Street in Knightsbridge, London

Coordinates: 51.4977°N 0.1650°W

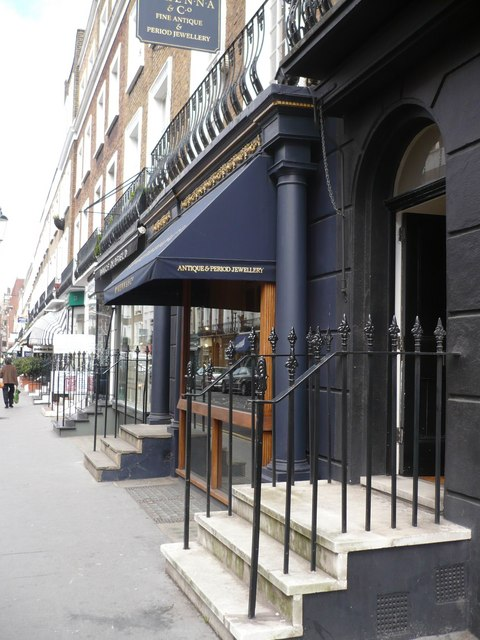
Beauchamp Place, 2008

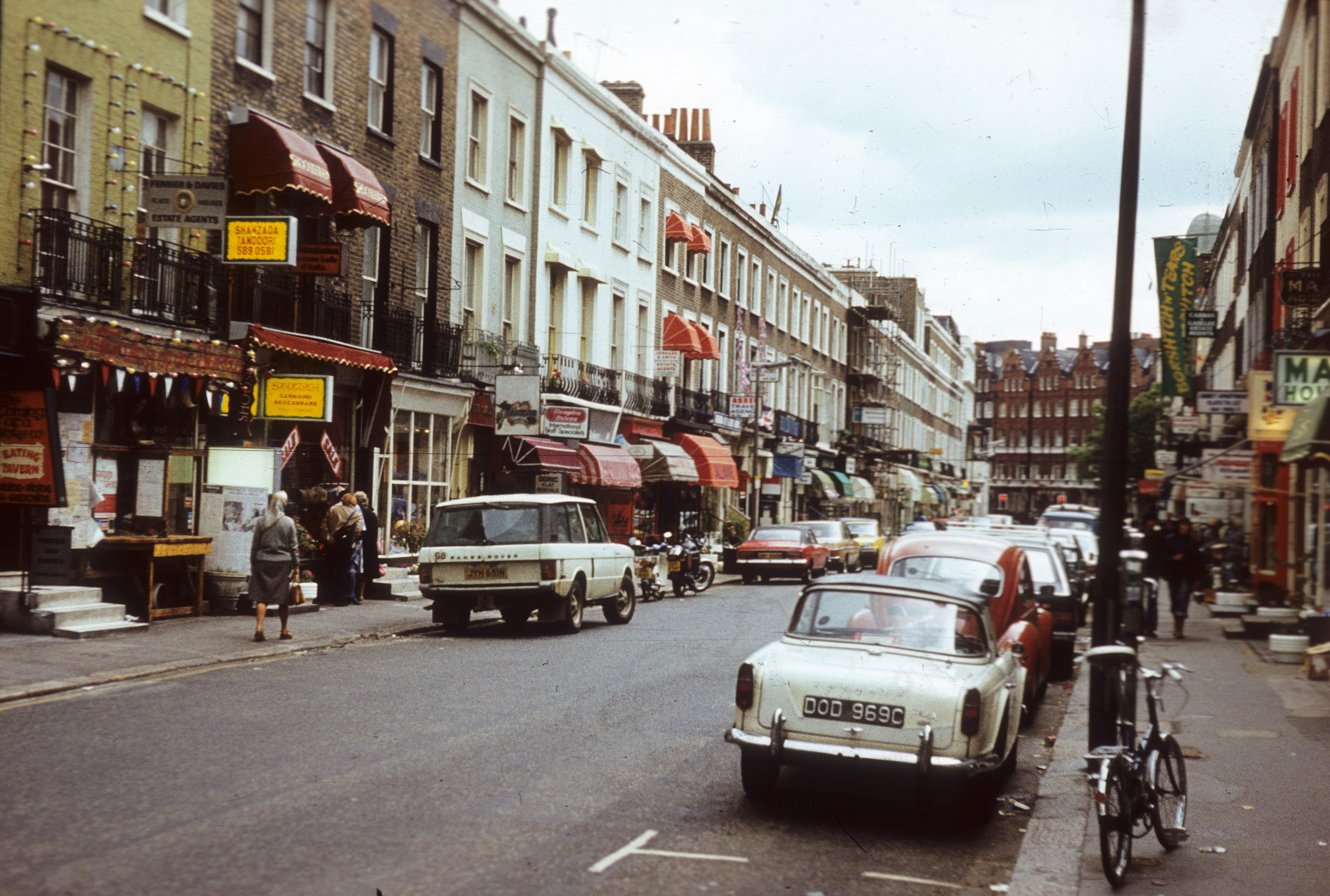
Beauchamp Place, 1977

Beauchamp Place (pronounced "Beecham Place") is a fashionable shopping street in the Knightsbridge district of London. Previously known as Grove Place until 1885, it has since evolved into a well-known shopping street.

It was once better known for its brothels and lodging houses, but since the Edwardian era, antique shops and high-end fashion boutiques have dominated the street.

Beauchamp Place originally referred to a 16th-century mansion belonging to the Seymour family, whose titles included Viscount Beauchamp. It belonged to Edward Seymour, Viscount Beauchamp, who became the Earl of Hertford and was the son of a Lord Protector of England.

The Italian restaurant San Lorenzo was situated at No. 22 between 1963 and its closure in 2022. It attracted many celebrities and influential people and became closely associated with Diana, Princess of Wales. Paparazzi photographers would regularly wait on Beauchamp Place to photograph the diners.

== See also ==
- List of eponymous roads in London
