= The Speakeasy Club =

London club and music venue, 1966–1978

Coordinates: 51°31′0″N 0°8′29″W

The Speakeasy Club, also known as The Speak, was a club situated at 48 Margaret Street, London, England, and was a popular late-night meeting place for the music industry from 1966 to June 1978. The club took its name and theme from the speakeasies of the American Prohibition era. The club was owned by Iraqi-born entrepreneur David Shamoon, along with Blaises and The Revolution Club.

== History ==
The Speakeasy Club was launched on 15 December 1966 under the management of Roy Flynn. Roy had previously been the main artist booker for the Bryan Morrison Agency and NEMS Enterprises. Jim Carter-Fea was also instated in management. The initial house DJ was Mike Vesty who had worked for Blaises. The opening of the club was headlined by pop band the Move, who had issued their debut single "Night of Fear" only six days prior. On 29 April 1968, the Speakeasy was burned down. After this it changed management. Tony Howard then took over with Laurie O'Leary. Laurie O'Leary who was a lifelong friend of the Kray twins and former PR of the Sybillas discothèque in Mayfair, London, became the promoter and publicity manager for the club.

== Clientele ==
The Speakeasy was frequented by record industry and artist agency executives. It attracted bands who played for low fees in the hope of being spotted and form the basis of the then emerging British rock scene. The club also attracted international touring bands and established artists.

== Musicians ==
Musicians and bands who played at the club (often after recording sessions) include Elton John, Cockney Rebel, The Rolling Stones, The Crazy World of Arthur Brown, Pink Floyd (who first appeared on 19 September 1967), Arthur Lee and Love, King Crimson, The Marmalade, The Mothers of Invention (October 1967), Yes, Jimi Hendrix (1966), David Bowie, Deep Purple (10 July 1969), The Velvet Underground (6 October 1971, Loaded Tour), Bob Marley (May 1973 Catch a Fire Tour), Jeff Beck, Reg Isidore, Ginger Baker, Jan Hammer, The Gass and Bobby Tench.

== Legacy ==
The Who refer to the club in their album The Who Sell Out ("Speakeasy, drink easy, pull easy") (1967), referencing the club in the "Radio London/Speakeasy/Rotosound Strings" commercial insert for the same album. Elvis Costello mentioned the club in his song "London's Brilliant Parade", included on the album Brutal Youth (1994). The Beatles also threw a party for The Monkees during their 1967 visit to England, which later became the basis for the song "Randy Scouse Git". The Bonzo Dog Doo-Dah Band filmed a promo in 1967 at the club for their song "Equestrian Statue".
