= Nigel Waymouth =

American designer (born 1941)

Nigel Waymouth (born 1941) is a designer and artist, a co-partner in the boutique, Granny Takes a Trip, and one of the two-man team, Hapshash and the Coloured Coat, which designed psychedelic posters in the 1960s. He has since had a solo career, including portrait painting.

== Life and work ==
Nigel Waymouth was born in Kasauli, India. His early childhood was spent in Argentina until he moved to England in 1953. He was educated at St Lawrence School and at Harrow Weald County Grammar School, under the tutelage of the future Home Secretary, Merlyn Rees. He graduated in economic history at University College London.

Following this, he attended art courses at various London art colleges. On leaving University college he also spent eighteen months working as a free-lance journalist, writing features on social issues for medical journals and editing an employment magazine. In January 1966 he and two partners, Sheila Cohen and John Pearse, opened the original rock-chic fashion boutique, Granny Takes a Trip.

Waymouth was responsible for the constantly changing shop fronts; he also designed the interior decor and many of the early clothes. While still involved in Granny Takes a Trip, in 1967 he teamed up with fellow artist Michael English and together they began designing many of the quintessential British pop posters of that era.

Their partnership lasted nearly two years under the name, Hapshash and the Coloured Coat. Most of the originals of these graphic designs and some of the clothes are now in the permanent collection of the Victoria and Albert Museum. In the fall of 2000, the museum held a large retrospective of the Hapshash and the Coloured Coat work. The Tate Gallery in Liverpool also included many of these designs in the "Summer of Love Psychedelic Art, 1967" exhibition in 2005, which traveled to Brooklyn in the summer of 2007.

Since 1970, Waymouth has pursued a career as a painter, and portraitist. His work has been exhibited in Fischer Fine Art, London (1977, 1978, 1979); Alex Reid & Lefevre, London (1984), Jonathan Clark Fine Art, London (1988), Keller & Greene, Los Angeles (2005), Jonathan Cooper Park Walk Gallery, London (2006). An exhibition entitled Haphash Takes a Trip: The Sixties Work of Nigel Waymouth was due to open at the Idea Generation Gallery in London in September 2011.

He has been included in the Royal Society of Portrait Painters group show. His works have been commissioned and collected by Mr. and Mrs. Rupert Murdoch, The Duchess of York, The Duke of Devonshire, Mr. and Mrs. Tom Hanks, Mr. Dominick Dunne, Dame Diana Rigg, Mr. Peter Morton, Mr. & Mrs. Eric Idle, Dr. & Mrs. Mortimer Sackler.

Nigel Waymouth lives and works in London. He has two sons by his marriage to interior decorator Lady Victoria Waymouth (1947–2004): Louis Waymouth, who is a writer on The Late Late Show with James Corden, and art curator and sculptor, Adam Waymouth.
