= Granny Takes a Trip =

Psychedelic boutique in 1960s London

Coordinates: 51.481785°N 0.181°W

- Trade name: Granny London
- Industry: Fashion
- Founded: 1966
- Headquarters: London, United Kingdom
- Area served: United Kingdom
- Key people: Marlot te Kiefte | (CEO)

One of the store front façades of Granny Takes a Trip

Granny Takes a Trip was a boutique opened in February 1966 at 488 Kings Road, Chelsea, London, by Nigel Waymouth, his girlfriend Sheila Cohen and John Pearse. The shop, which was acquired by Freddie Hornik in 1969, remained open until the mid-1970s and has been called the "first psychedelic boutique in Groovy London of the 1960s".

It was also the name of a Purple Gang song of the 1960s, which was named after the store and banned by the BBC.

The name has been appropriated by clothing stores around the world that are not connected with the original Granny Takes a Trip, including present-day vintage fashion stores in Hermosa Beach, California, Sunset Boulevard and Sydney, Australia.

== Opening ==
The boutique was the brainchild of two young Londoners, Nigel Waymouth and Sheila Cohen, who were looking for an outlet for Cohen's ever-increasing collection of antique clothes. Waymouth, a freelance journalist, came up with the name and was offered the premises at 488 Kings Road, Chelsea, London, a previously unfashionable part of the road known as the World's End. In the summer of 1965, John Pearse who had trained as a tailor on Savile Row, agreed to join them in the venture. The shop opened in early 1966.

By the spring of 1966, the shop had achieved worldwide renown, including a feature in Time magazine "London: The Swinging City". They paved the way for many of the designer boutiques that followed, such as Mr. Freedom, Alkasura, Let It Rock, and later the more ambitious enterprises of Malcolm McLaren and Vivienne Westwood and Paul Smith. Over the next eight years the shop clothed London's fashionable young men and women, including many major rock performers. A constant stream of people visited the shop, especially on Saturdays during the weekly King's Road Parade.

Initially the ambience was a mixture of New Orleans bordello and futuristic fantasy. Marbled patterns papered the walls, with rails carrying an assortment of brightly coloured clothes. Lace curtains draped the doorway of its single changing room, and a beaded glass curtain hung over the entrance at the top of steps, which led on into the shop. In the back room, an art deco Wurlitzer blasted out a selection of music.

The shop became known for its changing façade. In 1966 it featured successively giant portraits of Native American chiefs Low Dog and Kicking Bear. In 1967 the entire front was painted with a giant pop-art face of Jean Harlow. That was later replaced by an actual 1948 Dodge saloon car which appeared to crash out from the window and onto the forecourt.

== Acquisition by Freddie Hornik and opening of US outlets ==
By the end of the decade, the partnership had lost momentum. Nigel Waymouth had become involved in poster and album cover design work, as one half of Hapshash and the Coloured Coat with Michael English (which then evolved into a musical group), and John Pearse left for Italy to work with the Living Theatre group.

In late 1969, Cohen and Waymouth sold the business to London fashion entrepreneur Freddie Hornik, who had previously worked at Chelsea's Dandie Fashions. For a few months the previous year this had been the Beatles short-lived bespoke store Apple Tailoring.

Hornik brought in two New Yorkers, Gene Krell and Marty Breslau, and the team introduced a new, more dandified phase with rhinestone and appliquéd velvet suits and stack-heeled boots sold to such performers as Rod Stewart, Ronnie Wood and Keith Richards.

Around 1973, a couple asked Krell if they could open a store in Birmingham, Michigan, and he said sure, and this was opened around this time at 180 E. Brown Street, two blocks southwest of Creem Magazine's office, with racks of velvet suits along the walls in all different colors.

The London shop closed in 1974 with the acquisition of the name by Byron Hector, who moved the premises along the King's Road. This was closed in 1979.

Hornik retired to south London. He died, aged 65, on 19 February 2009.

== Granny Takes a Trip 2024 relaunch ==
On 10 April 2024 Granny Takes a Trip was relaunched as an online store backed by The Rolling Stones, amongst other private investors. CEO Marlot te Kiefte relaunched the brand, offering a garment rental service as well as retail, taking inspiration from the original boutique in their designs. Granny London stopped trading in October 2024.

== Image gallery ==
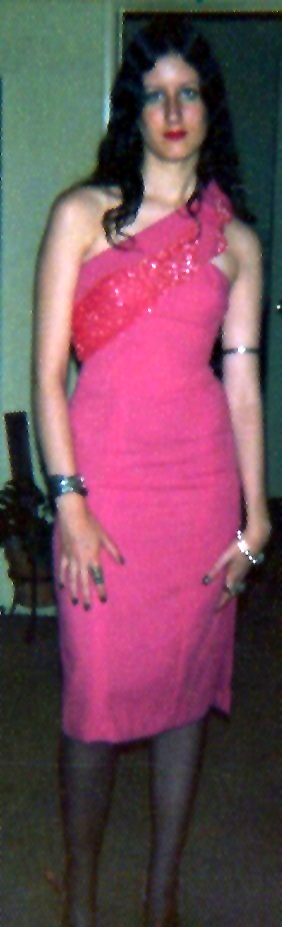
Dress from Granny Takes a Trip's West Hollywood boutique worn in 1974

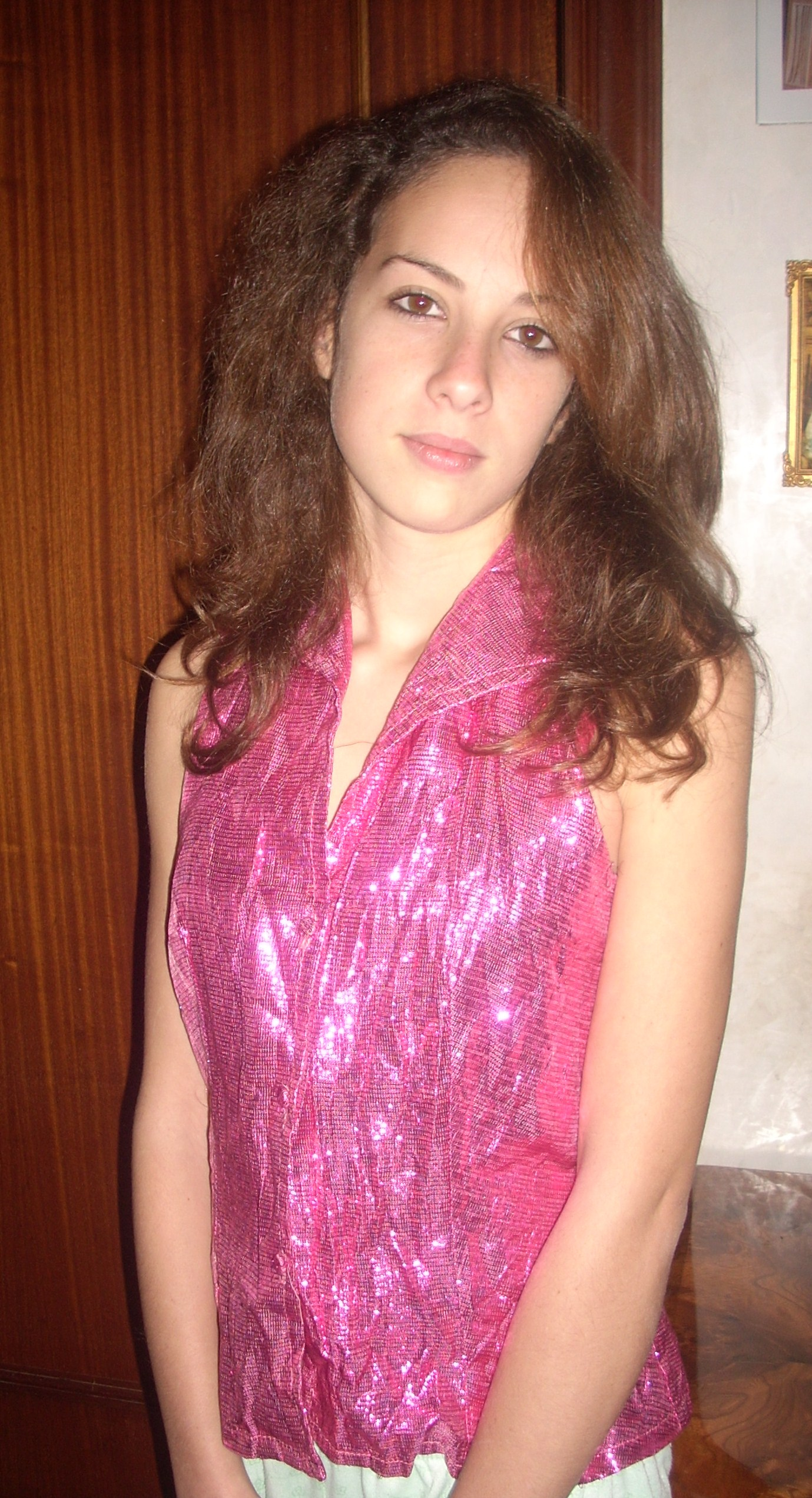
Girl wearing a 1973-vintage lamé top with the Granny Takes a Trip label.

== See also ==
- Afghan coat
- Top Gear
- Hapshash and the Coloured Coat
