= King's Road =

Street in Chelsea and Fulham, London

Coordinates: 51.48737°N 0.168874°W

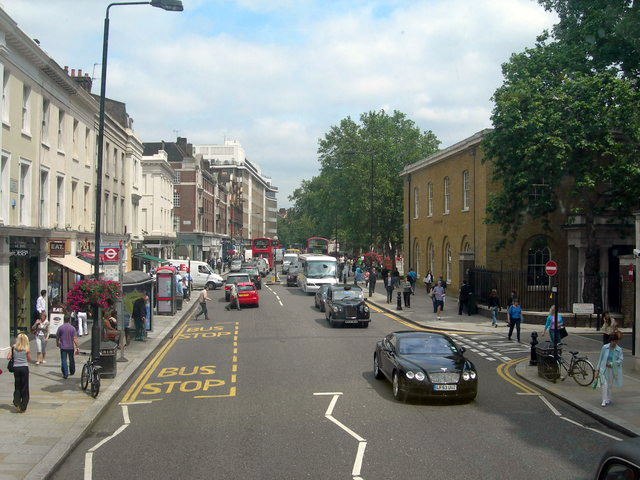
- King's Road, looking east towards Sloane Square
- Interactive map of King's Road
- Length: 1.9 mi (3.1 km)
- Location: Chelsea, London, England
- Postal code: SW3, SW6, SW10
- South end: Sloane Square
- West end: Waterford Road

Other
- Known for: Shopping, Peter Jones, Saatchi Gallery

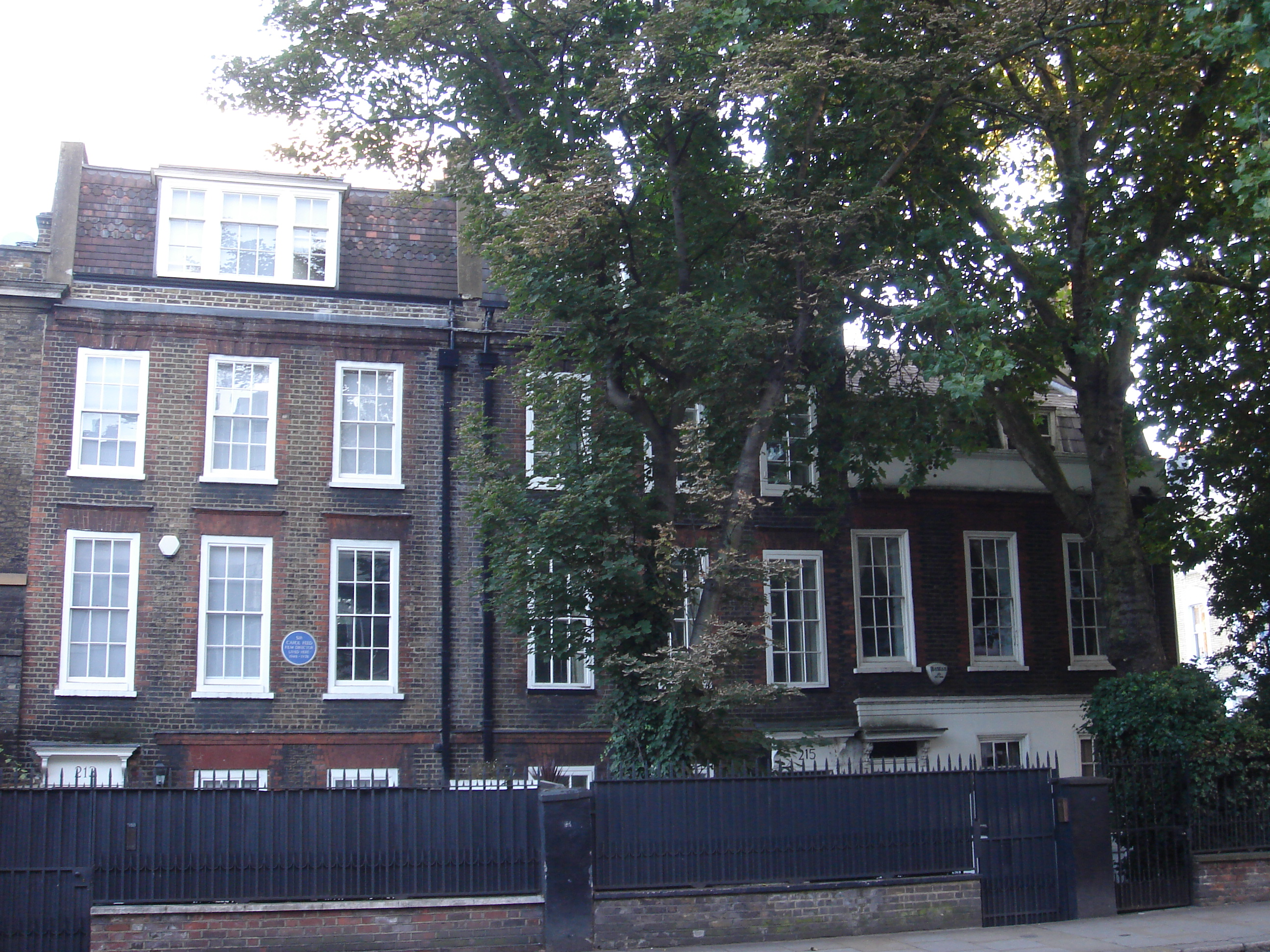
213–217 King's Road

King's Road or Kings Road (or sometimes the King's Road, especially when it was the king's private road until 1830, or as a colloquialism by middle/upper class London residents) is a major street stretching through Chelsea and Fulham, both in West London, England. It is associated with 1960s style and with fashion figures such as Mary Quant and Vivienne Westwood. Sir Oswald Mosley's Blackshirt movement had a barracks on the street in the 1930s.

== Location ==
King's Road runs for just under two miles (3.2 km) through Chelsea, in the Royal Borough of Kensington & Chelsea, from Sloane Square in the east (on the border with Belgravia and Knightsbridge) and through the Chelsea Design Quarter (Moore Park Estate) on the border of Chelsea and Fulham. Shortly after crossing Stanley Bridge the road passes a slight kink at the junction with Waterford Road, where it then becomes New King's Road, continuing to Fulham High Street and Putney Bridge; its western end is in the London Borough of Hammersmith & Fulham.

== History ==
King's Road derives its name from its function as a private road used by King Charles II to travel to Kew. It remained a private royal road until 1830, but people with connections were able to use it. Some houses date from the early 18th century. No. 213 has a blue plaque to film director Sir Carol Reed, who lived there from 1948 until his death in 1976. Thomas Arne lived at no. 215 and is believed to have composed "Rule Britannia" there. Ellen Terry lived in the same house from 1904 to 1920, and also Peter Ustinov; Terry's residence is also commemorated by a blue plaque. The photographer Christina Broom was born in 1862 at no. 8.

In 1871, the Chelsea Hospital for Women was founded on King's Road, later moving to Fulham Road. The corner of King's Road and Manresa Road was occupied from 1895 to 1985 by Chelsea College of Science and Technology before it was subsumed into King's College London and immediately sold into private hands.

The world's first artificial ice rink, the Glaciarium, opened just off King's Road in 1876, and later that year it relocated to a building on the street.

During the 1960s the street became a symbol of mod culture, evoking "an endless frieze of mini-skirted, booted, fair-haired angular angels", one magazine later wrote. Mary Quant opened her boutique BAZAAR at 138a King's Road in 1955. King's Road was home in that decade to the Chelsea Drugstore (originally a chemist with a stylised chrome-and-neon soda fountain upstairs, later a public house), and in the 1970s to Malcolm McLaren's boutique Let It Rock, which was renamed SEX in 1974, and then Seditionaries in 1977. During the hippie and punk eras it was a centre for counterculture, but has since been gentrified. It serves as Chelsea's high street and has a reputation for being one of London's most fashionable shopping streets. Other celebrated boutiques included Granny Takes a Trip.

484 King's Road was the headquarters of Swan Song Records, owned by Led Zeppelin. The company was closed and the building vacated in 1983. King's Road was the site of the first UK branch of Starbucks, which opened in 1999.

In 1984, Keith Wainwright, a pioneer responsible for starting one of the first men's hairdressers catering for the longer men's styles of the time, with such clients including Roy Wood, Cat Stevens and The Walker Brothers, opened the salon "Smile", at 434 King's Road.

535 King's Road was the headquarters of Cube Records, an independent record label of the late 1960s and early 1970s. The label folded in the mid-1970s, becoming part of Elektra Records. The building has since been demolished but the new building on the same site still houses a record company.

== In popular culture ==
The road has been represented in popular culture on various occasions: "King's Road" is the title of a song by Tom Petty & the Heartbreakers from the 1981 album Hard Promises and is name-checked in the song "Dick a Dum Dum (King's Road)" which was a hit for Des O'Connor in 1969. In Ian Fleming's novels, James Bond lives in an unspecified fashionable square just off King's Road. Al Stewart wrote "Gina in the King's Road" for his 2005 album A Beach Full of Shells.

In the 1960s radio series Round the Horne, in the 'Jules and Sandy' section, their establishment (named 'Bona...'), is often located in the King's Road (for example, Bona Books in series 4).

Pet Shop Boys met in an electronics shop on King's Road in August 1981.

== Planning and transport ==
=== Planning ===
The eastern part of King's Road is identified in the London Plan as one of 35 major centres in Greater London. King's Road is part of A3217.

=== Bus ===
Buses 10, 11, 22, 49, 211, 319, 328, and C3 all go down King's Road, yet most of these turn off the street at one point or another. The 11 and the 22 are the only routes which run the entirety of King's Road, with the 22 being the only route that runs all the way from Sloane Square to the end of New King's Road in Fulham.

=== Rail and tube ===
The western end of King's Road is close to Imperial Wharf railway station on the London Overground network, with connections to Willesden Junction and Clapham Junction. Southern also run direct rail services to Milton Keynes Central and East Croydon from this station. At the eastern end of the street is Sloane Square, and Fulham Broadway lies at the western end, on the boundary between Chelsea and Fulham. King's Road, and the area of Chelsea as a whole, is known for having poor links to the London Underground. Due to this, the route of Crossrail 2 is proposed to have an underground station in this area, called King's Road Chelsea.

=== River ===
Chelsea Harbour Pier is also within easy reach of the western end of King's Road, with river bus services provided by London River Services and Thames Executive Charters to Putney and Blackfriars. Further east, the same services are also provided at Cadogan Pier, only a few blocks south of King's Road near the Albert Bridge.

== See also ==
- 213 and 215 King's Road
- 190 New King's Road
- Cadogan Estate
- Carlyle Square
- Markham Square
- Mallord Street
- King's Highway (disambiguation)
- Sloane Ranger
- World's End, Chelsea
- List of eponymous roads in London
- Fulham
- Parsons Green
- Sands End
