= Rumi Verjee =

British businessman and politician (born 1957)

The Right Honourable The Lord Verjee CBE
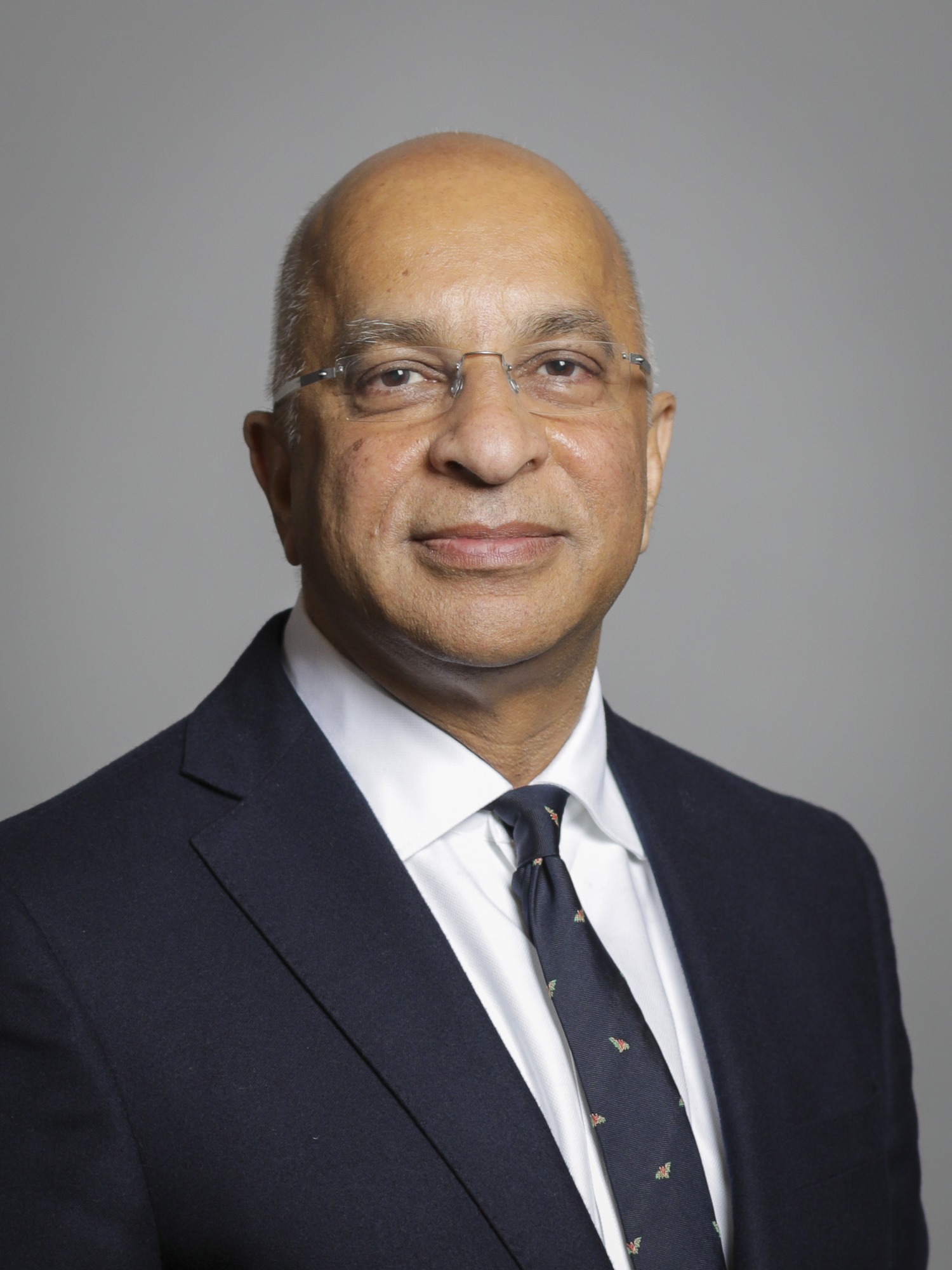
- Official portrait, 2019

Member of the House of Lords
- Lord Temporal
- Life peerage 17 September 2013

Personal details
- Born: 1957 (age 68–69) Kampala, Uganda
- Education: Haileybury College
- Alma mater: Downing College, Cambridge
- Occupation: Businessman and philanthropist
- Known for: Founding Domino's Pizza in the UK

Rumi Verjee, Baron Verjee, CBE (born 1957), is a British businessman, philanthropist and Liberal Democrat member of the House of Lords. Born in Uganda, Rumi moved to the UK as a child before studying at Downing College, Cambridge.

== Early life ==
Rumi Verjee was born in Uganda and spent his early childhood in Kenya before coming to Britain. Many of the Verjee family assets were seized under Idi Amin's regime in the expulsion of Indians in Uganda in 1972.

== Education ==
He attended Haileybury College, Hertford, and Downing College, Cambridge, where he gained a BA in law, before being called to the Bar from Middle Temple.

== Business ==
Aged 27, Verjee approached Tom Monaghan at a conference in the US, and persuaded him to sell the franchising rights to Domino's Pizza in the UK. Verjee launched the chain in Britain and it now employs over 20,000 people in the UK. Verjee sold his stake in the firm in 1989, and went on to oversee the development of the Brompton Hospital site. From 1993 until 1997, Verjee, alongside the singer Elton John, co-owned Watford F.C. In 1995, he bought Thomas Goode, which holds two royal warrants and has over 160 years experience in iconic glassworks. He sold Thomas Goode in 2018.

== Philanthropy ==
Verjee established a UK Charity called The Rumi Foundation in 2006. The Foundation supports humanitarian work through education, innovation and knowledge building. Its work is principally focussed in the UK but has also supported projects in India, East Africa and South America.

In keeping with its aims, the Foundation has supported a number of initiatives including:

- Established a Chair in perpetuity at Downing College Cambridge, to research the early detection of cancer in children.
- Endowed a five-year programme of Innovation Night Lectures at the Royal College of Art. Speakers have included will.i.am, Director of Creative Innovation, Intel, the fashion designer Christopher Bailey, Chief Creative Officer at Burberry, and Chad Hurley, Founder of YouTube.
- The Global Leadership Foundation, established by Nobel Peace Prize winner, F.W. de Klerk, which draws on the vast experience of former presidents, Prime Ministers, and senior ministers to discreetly and in confidence support current political leaders, promote good governance around the world and to strengthen democratic institutions and practices.
- Supported the launch, of Free the Children becoming Chair of the UK board of directors in 2014. Alongside Holly Branson, Verjee co-chairs the UK initiative, We Day which encourages young people to take a greater role in their communities. Princess Beatrice has since gone on to become involved in WE Day.
- An ongoing partnership with the Clinton Foundation on their Building Tomorrow project in Uganda.
- Mosaic, a charity whose patron is King Charles III and is dedicated to teaming up young people from deprived communities with high-flying mentors who can help them negotiate life's challenges.
- Sponsoring the Wired Innovation Fellowships.

Verjee was appointed a Commander of the Order of the British Empire (CBE) in the 2009 Birthday Honours for charitable services. In addition, the British Olympic Association appointed Verjee to its advisory board ahead of the London Olympic and Paralympic Games.

In 2015, it was announced that Verjee had become an adviser to MassChallenge, the world's biggest startup accelerator programme.

In 2017, it was estimated that Verjee had given away a total of £33.9 million, which equated to 20.54% of his wealth.

== Politics ==
An active Liberal Democrat for several years, Verjee was appointed to the House of Lords in August 2013. His political activity includes support for the party's Leadership programme to improve representation from under-represented groups.

On 17 September 2013 he was created a life peer taking the title Baron Verjee, of Portobello in the Royal Borough of Kensington and Chelsea.

Orders of precedence in the United Kingdom
Preceded by The Lord Leigh of Hurley	Gentlemen; Baron Verjee	Followed by The Lord Haughey
