= Timbrell =

Timbrell is a surname. Notable people with the surname include:

- Benjamin Timbrell (c. 1683–1754), English master builder and architect
- Dennis Timbrell (born 1946), Canadian politician
- Robert Timbrell (1920–2006), Canadian admiral
- Tiny Timbrell (1917–1992), Canadian-born session musician and master guitarist
