= Dovehouse Street =

Street in London, England

Coordinates: 51°29′20″N 0°10′17″W

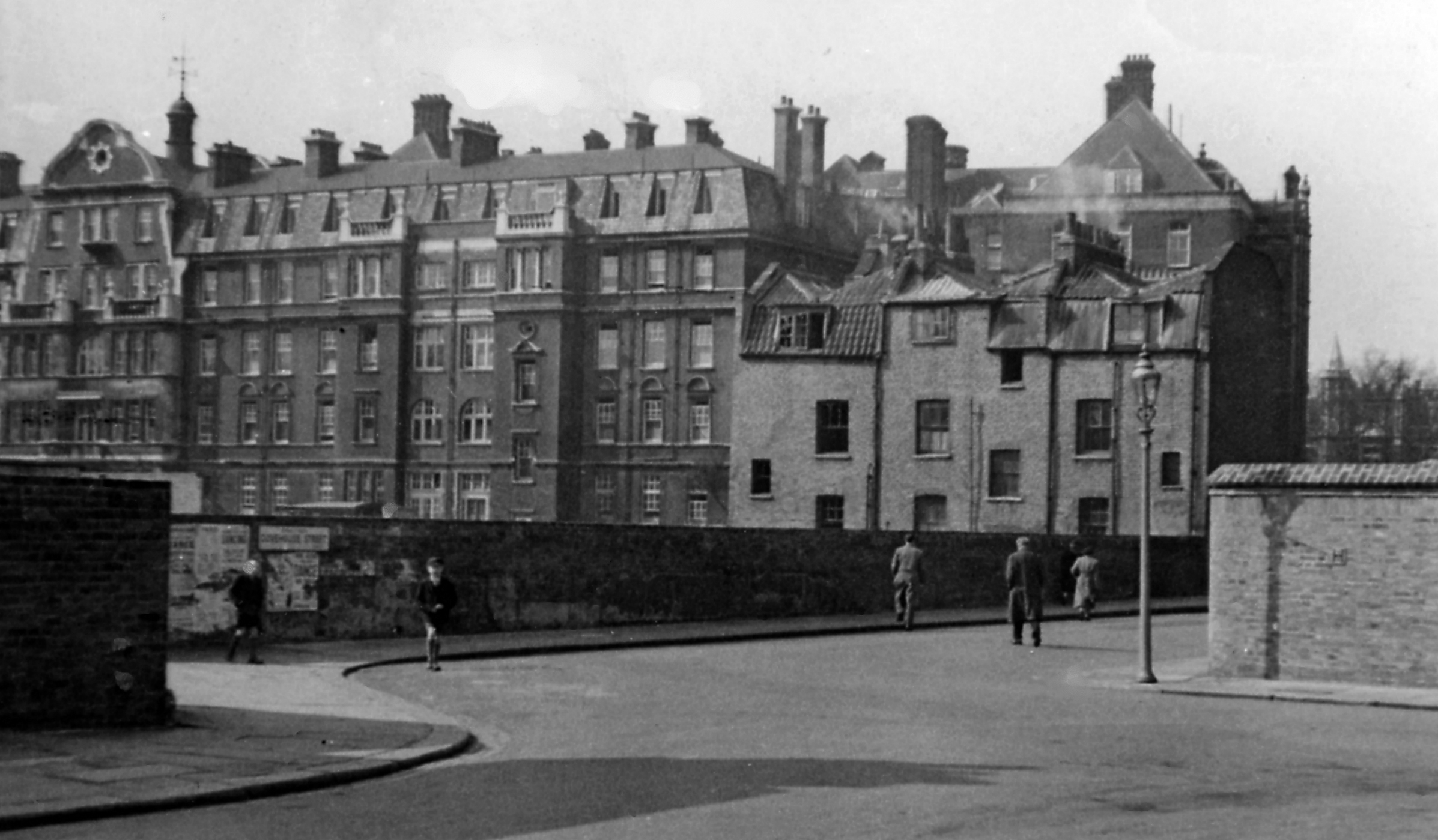
Dovehouse Street, 1955

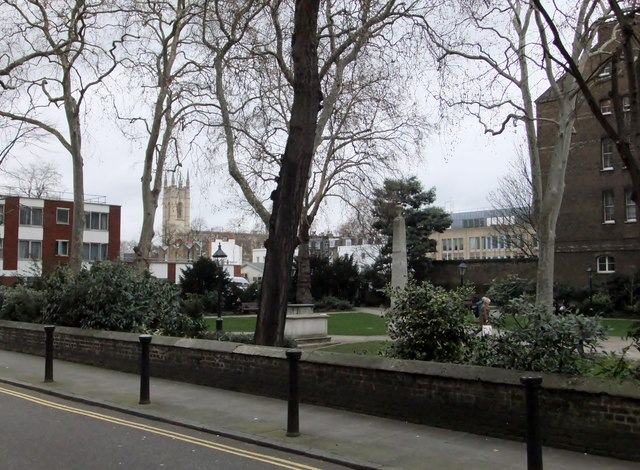
Dovehouse Green and Dovehouse Street, 2013

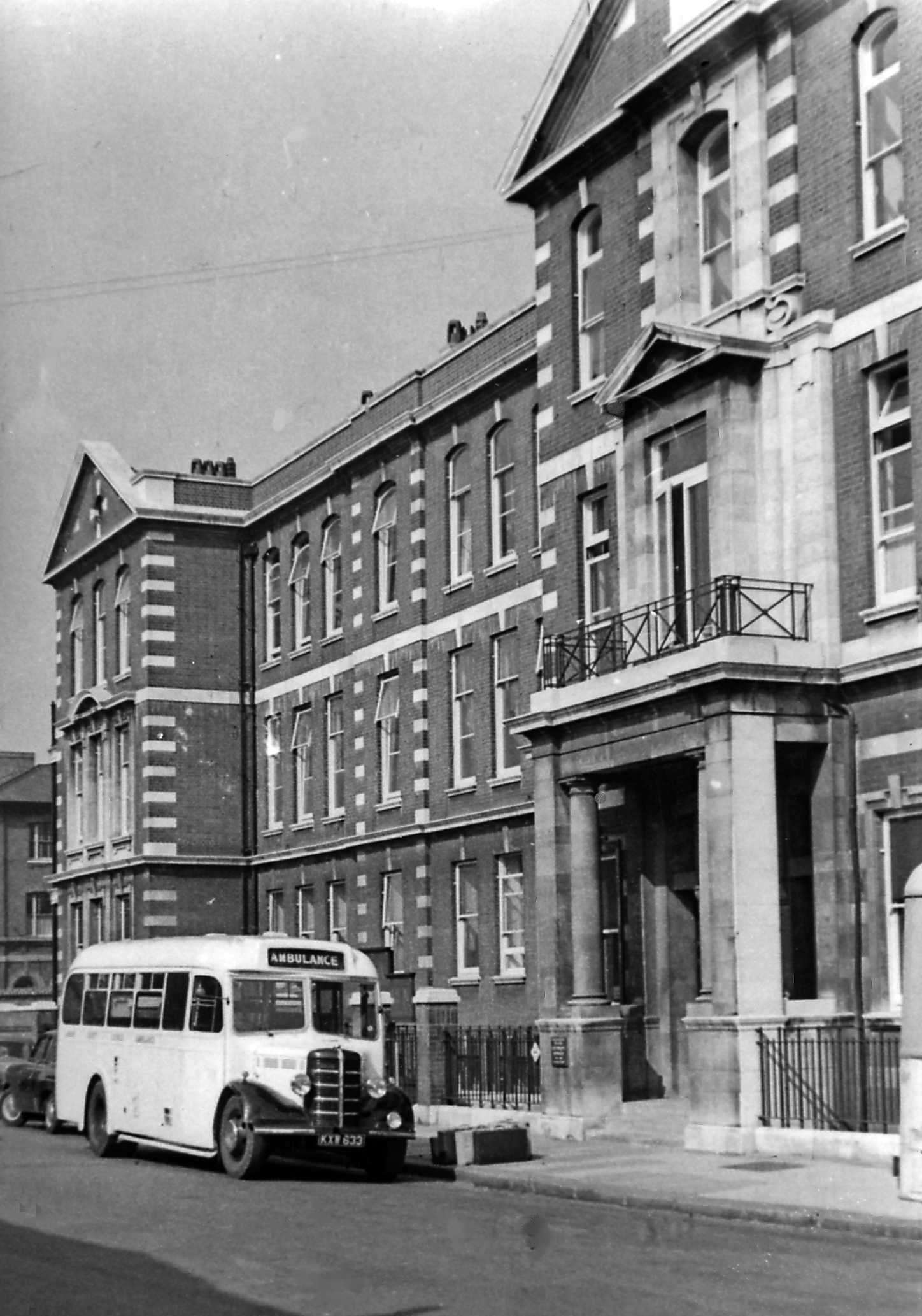
Chelsea Hospital for Women, 1955

Dovehouse Street is a street in Chelsea, London. It runs roughly north to south from Fulham Road to King's Road, having junctions with Cale Street and Britten Street, among others.

The National Heart and Lung Institute (NHLI), part of Imperial College London in the Guy Scadding Building is on the corner with Cale Street.

Auriens, a luxury retirement complex overlooking Dovehouse Green, was built on the site of what was the London Borough of Kensington and Chelsea's only local authority care home.

The Chelsea Hospital for Women was at the top end of the street, but closed in 1988 and the buildings became the Chelsea wing of the Royal Brompton Hospital.

At the southern end, with Dovehouse Green and King's Road lies one of two possible locations for King's Road Chelsea railway station, a proposed station on Crossrail 2, a planned underground railway line.

== Notable residents ==
- Emlyn Williams, Welsh dramatist and actor died in 1987 at his flat in Dovehouse Street
