= South Audley Street =

Shopping street in Mayfair, London

Coordinates: 51°30′31″N 00°09′05″W

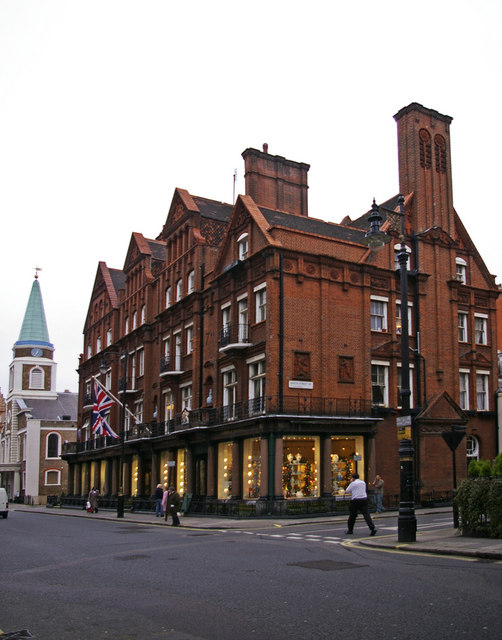
South Audley Street, showing Thomas Goode and the Grosvenor Chapel

South Audley Street is a major shopping street in Mayfair, London. It runs north to south from the southwest corner of Grosvenor Square to Curzon Street.

== History ==
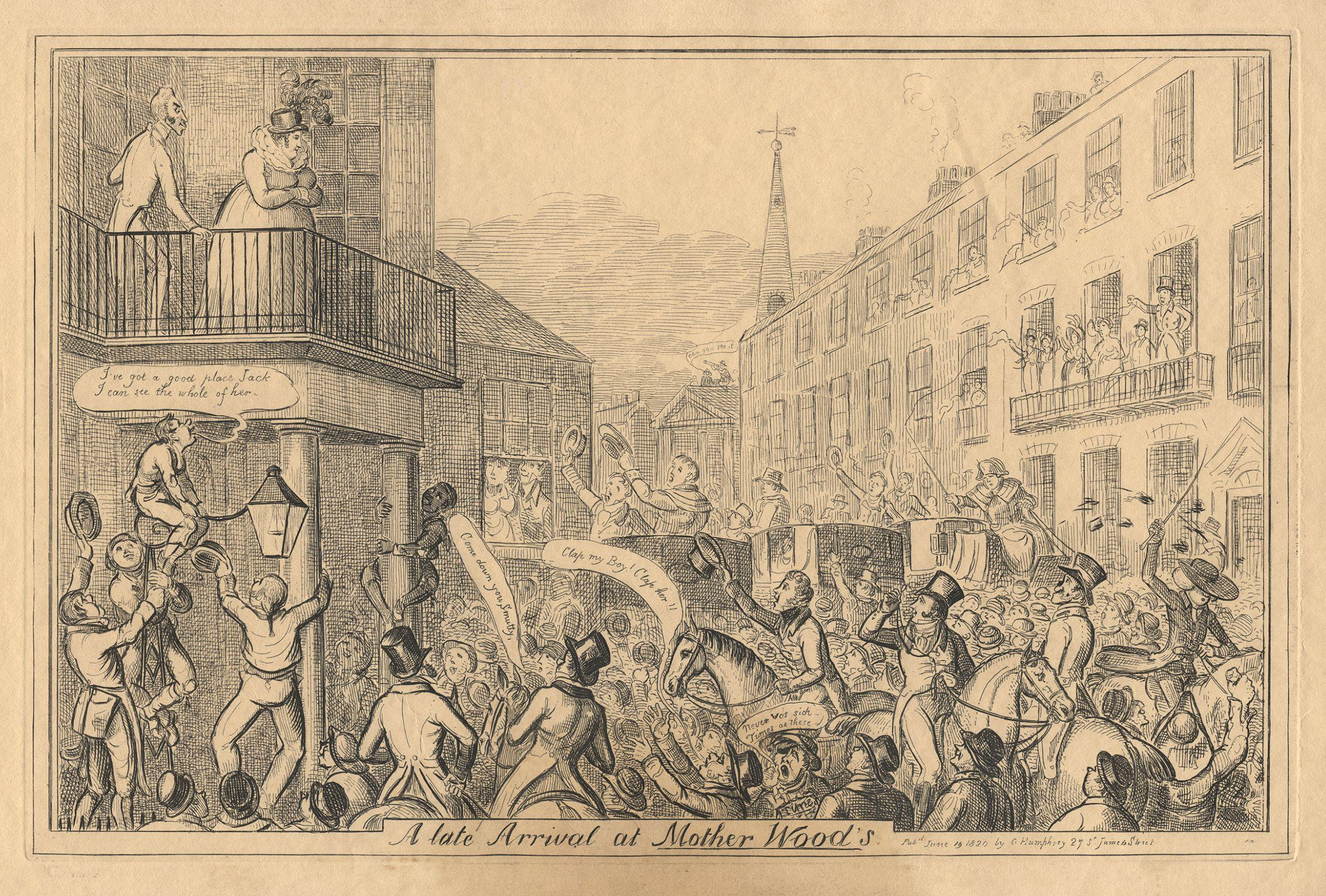
Caroline of Brunswick waving to crowds in South Audley Street, drawn by Robert Cruikshank

The street is named after Hugh Audley, whose heirs acquired the land following Sir Thomas Grosvenor's marriage to Mary Davies in 1677. Construction of properties along the street began in 1720, initially with small houses at the north end and larger family residences to the south. This reflected a social convention that was common at this time.

South Audley Street was redeveloped between 1875 and 1900, when most of the smaller buildings to the north were demolished and rebuilt as shops with residences above them. However, several buildings (Nos. 9–16 and 71–75 consecutive) all survive from the 1730s.

Audley Square was a short abutment at the south end of the street. Unlike other significant squares in Mayfair, it was three sided and had no garden. The first multistorey car park in the City of Westminster opened here in 1962.

== Properties ==
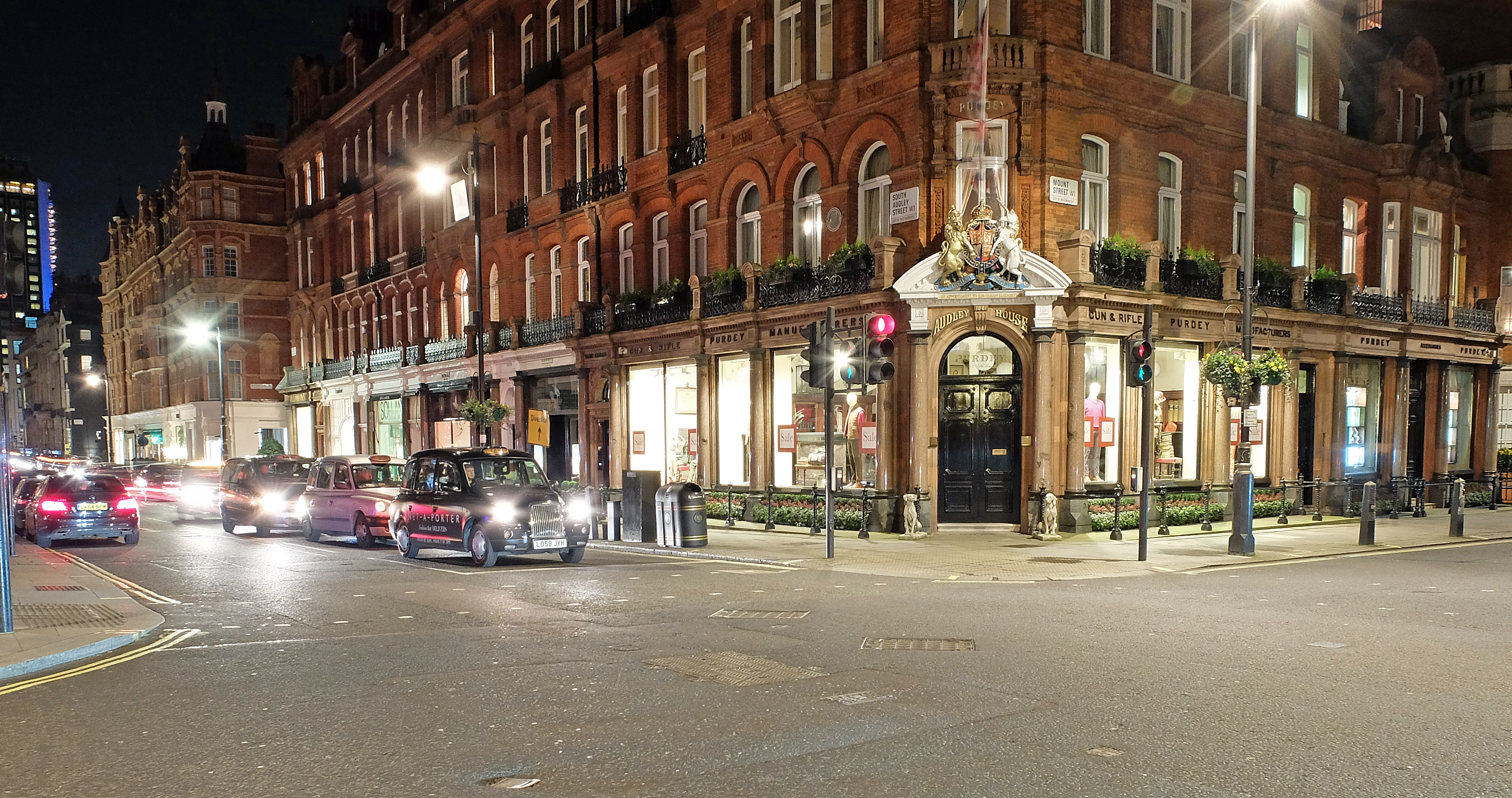
James Purdey & Sons

The Grosvenor Chapel is a Grade II* listed chapel on South Audley Street, and the only remaining original property on the north part of the street. It was built by Benjamin Timbrell in 1730, and became a chapel of ease for St George's Hanover Square Church in 1831. During World War II it was used by American armed forces. The parents of Arthur Wellesley, 1st Duke of Wellington are buried in the church.

Chesterfield House was a grand house on South Audley Street, between South Audley Street and what is now Chesterfield Street. It was built by Isaac Ware for Philip Stanhope, 4th Earl of Chesterfield between 1747 and 1750. It was demolished in 1937, replaced by a block of flats with the same name.

Leconfield House, built in 1939, is at the corner of South Audley Street and Curzon Street. It is best known for being the former headquarters of MI5.

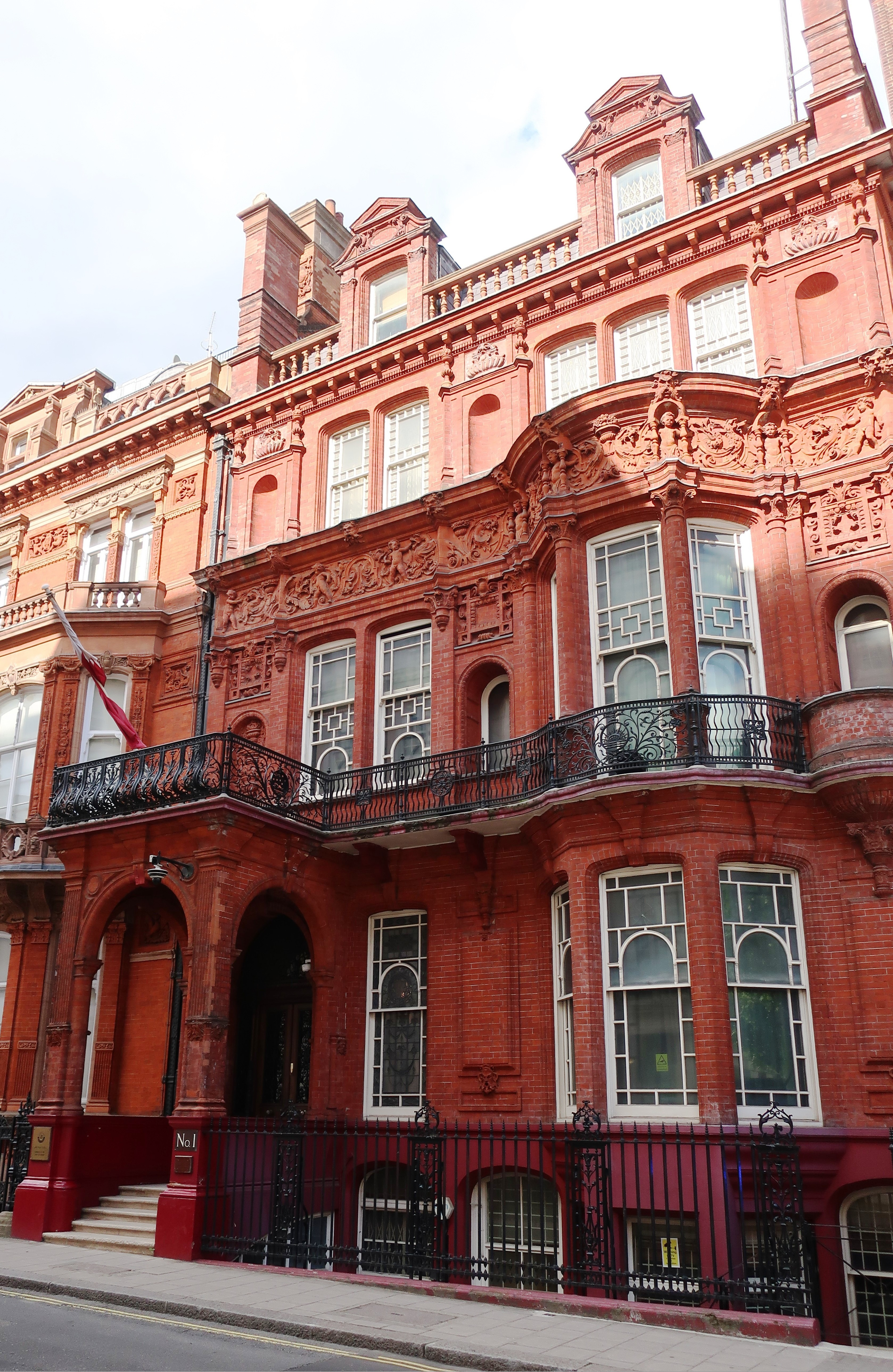
Embassy of Qatar

The Qatari embassy is at No 1. It has been Grade II listed since 1970.

8 South Audley Street, Mayfair, constructed in 1744, currently houses the Nehru Centre, London; the House has previously been known as Cambridge House, Curzon House, and Alington House, and was used as a Royal Residence by Caroline of Brunswick, Prince Frederick, Duke of York and Albany, and Prince Adolphus, Duke of Cambridge during the 1820s and 1830s.

The sculptor Richard Westmacott (1775-1856) lived and died at No 14, and there is a blue plaque. No. 14 later housed the International Musicians Association rehearsal space and club, frequented by writers and musicians including Kingsley Amis, John Dickson Carr, Gerald Hoffnung, Bruce Montgomery and Malcolm Arnold. Amis described the club as "the most drunken institution in the world".

Thomas Goode's tableware shop was first established in 1844 at No. 17. It gradually expanded throughout the 19th century; the current premises at Nos. 17–22 was constructed between 1875 and 1891 by Ernest George.

The private member's dining club Harry's Bar was established at No. 26 in 1979.

Gunsmiths James Purdey & Sons was established at Nos. 57–60 in 1881.

Charles X, King of France from 1824 to 1830, spent several years living in exile in Britain from the late 1790s. He lived at 72 South Audley Street between 1805 and 1814. There is a blue plaque.

Caroline of Brunswick (consort of King George IV) briefly stayed at No. 77 South Audley Street after returning from Italy in 1820. She was considered a popular queen and appeared at the balcony of the house to cheering crowds.

== See also ==
- North Audley Street
