= Thomas Goode (tableware) =

Coordinates: 51°30′31″N 0°9′5″W

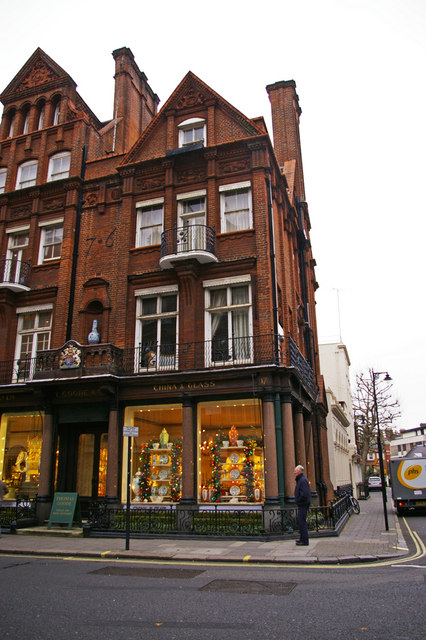
- Front of the premises on South Audley Street
- Interactive map of the Thomas Goode area

General information
- Location: South Audley Street, London, England
- Construction started: 1827 (business); 1845 (this premises)

Thomas Goode was a china, silverware and glass shop at 19 South Audley Street in Mayfair, London, and later at 66-67 Burlington Arcade, Piccadilly London. It held two royal warrants to supply the British royal household, one from Queen Elizabeth II and the other from the Prince of Wales. The company was owned by property entrepreneur Johnny Sandelson since 2018 and had since expanded its operations into India opening a store and museum in Mumbai.

== History ==
The business was established in 1827 by Thomas Goode, and expanded by his son William. The younger Goode designed china ranges for both Queen Victoria and the Tsar of Russia. The store moved to its South Audley Street site in 1845. In 1875 its showroom was redesigned by the architects Peto and George.

The company was owned by the Liberal Democrat peer Rumi Verjee from 1995 to 2018.

The building was sold to property entrepreneur Cain for £80 million in 2015, but Verjee retained ownership of the business. Johnny Sandelson acquired the business in 2018.

It was closed at 2024.

== The Thomas Goode Elephants ==
As part of The Paris Exhibition in 1889, Minton pottery was commissioned to create two, seven feet tall majolica elephants to display. These elephants were on display in the windows of Thomas Goode.
