= Cale Street =

Street in Chelsea, London, England

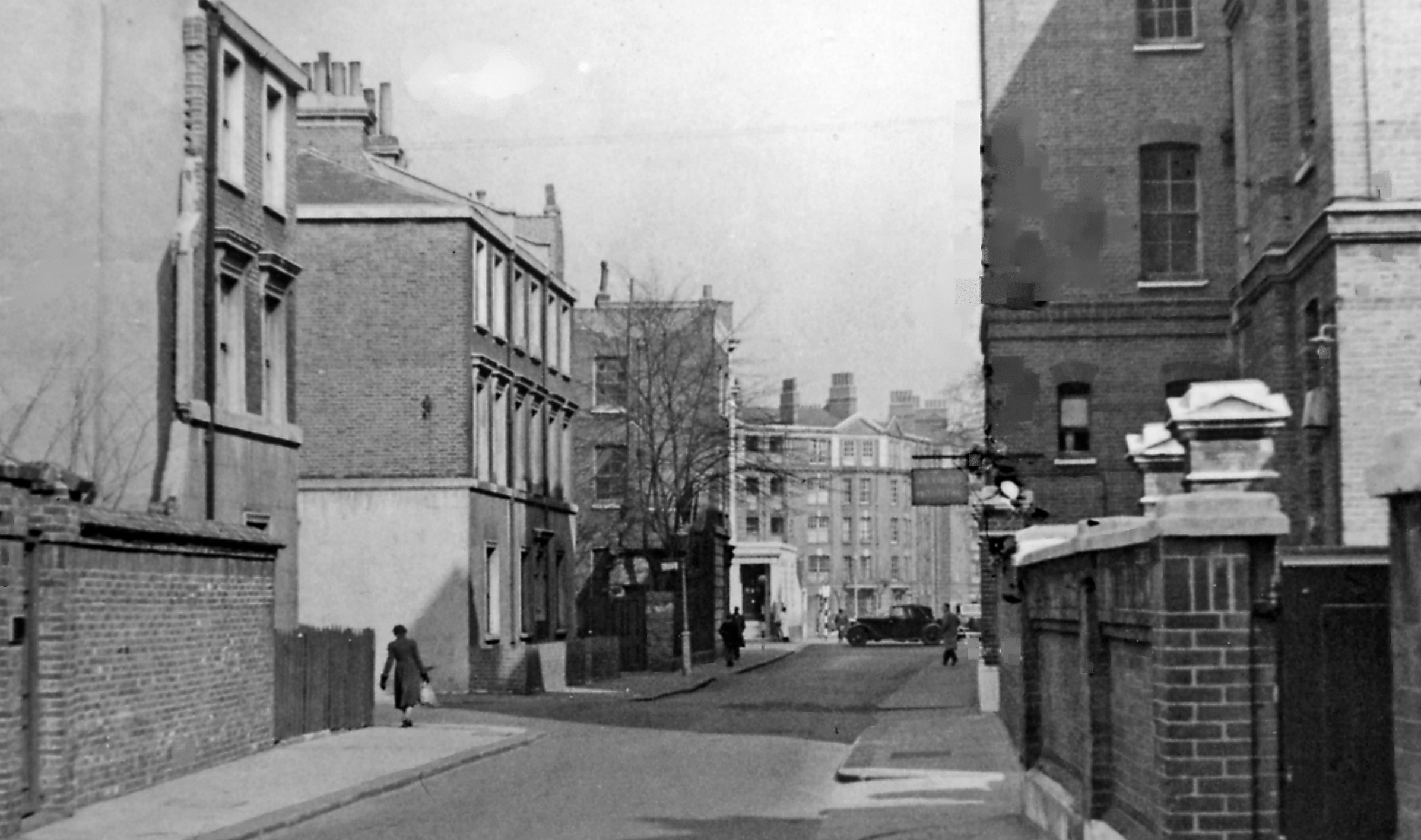
- Cale Street from Dovehouse Street, 1955

- Location within Royal Borough of Kensington and Chelsea
- Former name: Bond Street (west) College Place (east)
- Area: Chelsea
- Location: Royal Borough of Kensington and Chelsea, London, UK
- Coordinates: 51.4904°N 0.1690°W

Construction
- Completion: By 1836

Other
- Known for: Location of distillery where Beefeater Gin first made

Cale Street is a street in Chelsea, London. It runs between Dovehouse Street in the west and the junction of Elystan Street and Elystan Place in the east. It originally formed the southern boundary of Chelsea Common. The street was laid out in 1836, and was called Bond Street at the western end and College Place at the eastern but was later renamed Cale Street in honour of Judith Cale, a benefactor to the parish.

== Location ==
Cale Street is in the Chelsea district of London's Royal Borough of Kensington and Chelsea in England. It runs between Dovehouse Street (formerly Arthur Street) in the west and the junction of Elystan Street and Elystan Place in the east and is joined on its north side by Guthrie Street, Stewart's Grove, Bury Walk, Ixworth Place, and Whitehead's Grove. It is crossed by Sydney Street (formerly Robert Terrace) and joined on its south side by St Luke's Street, Astell Street, Danube Street, Godfrey Street, and Jubilee Place. Crooked Usage once joined Cale Street to Britten Street in the south.

== History ==
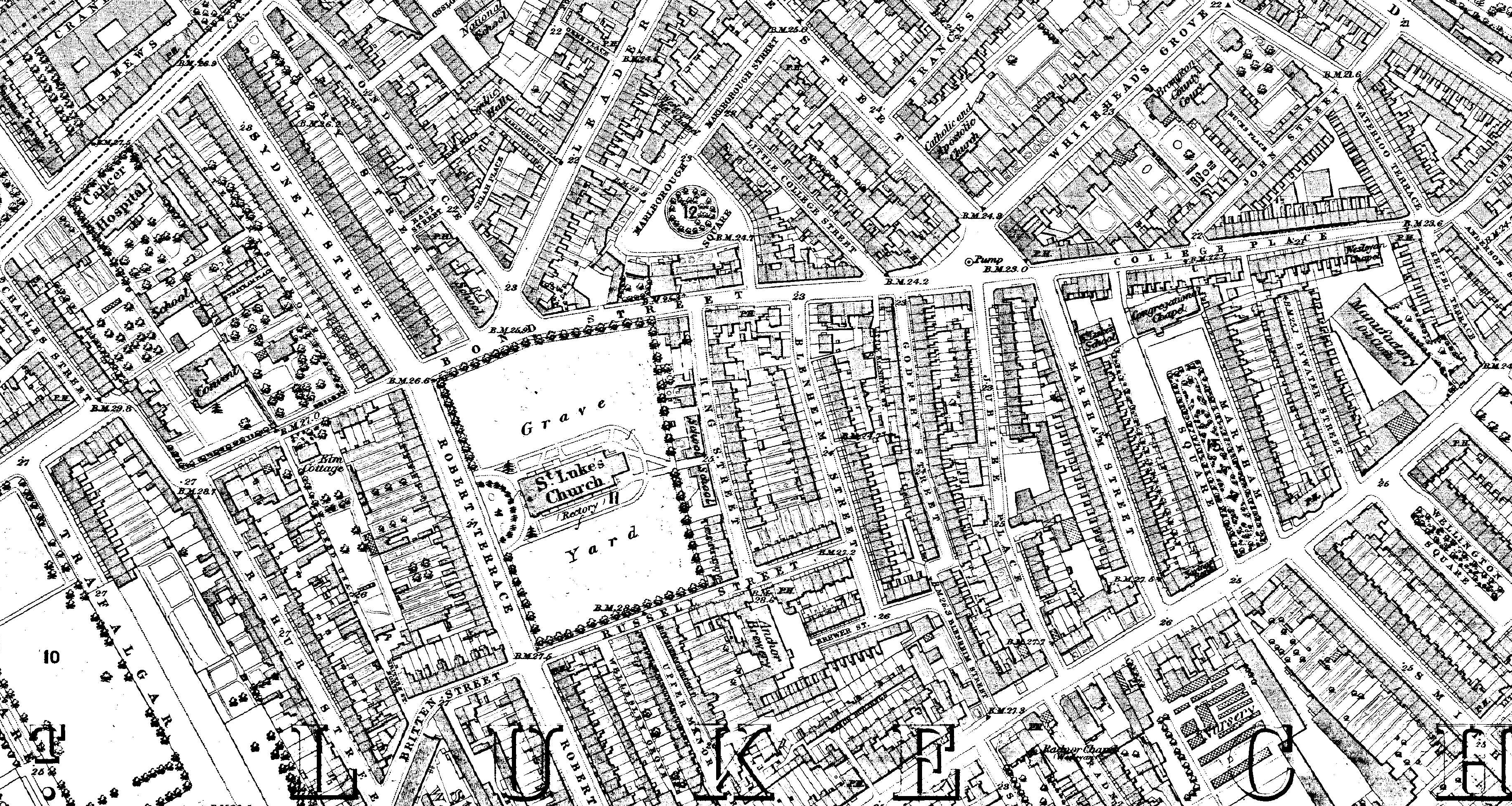
Cale Street on an 1869–1880 Ordnance Survey map

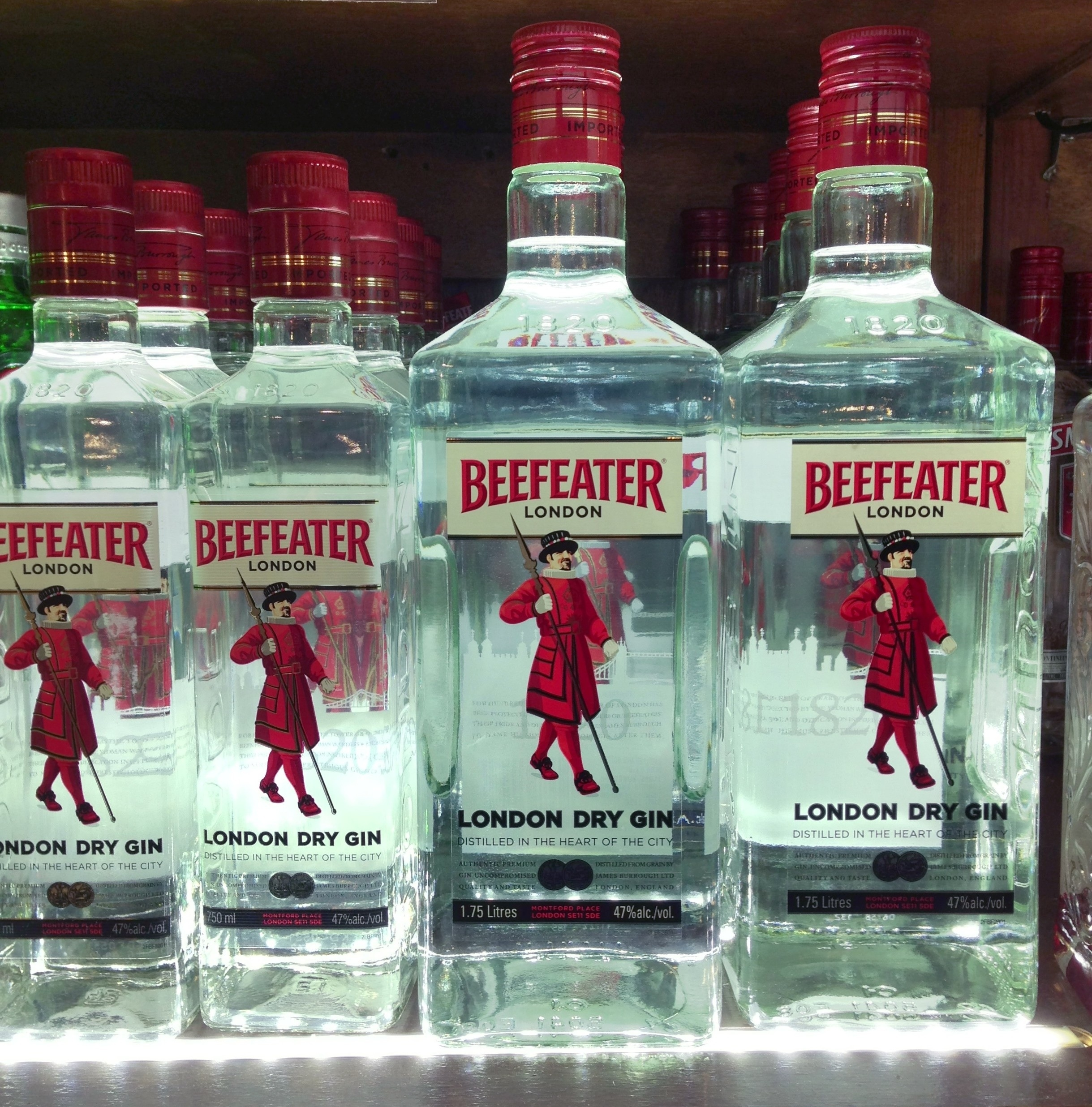
Beefeater Gin, first distilled in Cale Street

Cale Street originally formed the southern boundary of the 37-acre (15 ha) Chelsea Common, with a pond and gravel pits, but over time the land was all developed for housing. A new street was laid out in 1836, and was called Bond Street at the western end and College Place at the eastern. The street was later renamed Cale Street in honour of Judith Cale, who died in 1717 and left a legacy for the benefit of six poor widows of Chelsea, the interest on which was distributed to them each Christmas Day.

In 1820, the Chelsea Distillery, a gin manufacturer in what became Cale Street, was opened by the Taylor family, and in 1863, was purchased for £400 by James Burrough, a pharmacist and the founder of Beefeater Gin, which was first produced there, and distilled there until 1908, when it moved to the Cale Street Distillery in Hutton Road in Lambeth.

The Japanese watercolour artist and writer Yoshio Markino painted Gale Street, Chelsea, in Snow in 1907, and this is thought to be a misrendering of Cale Street, which he would have seen from a window of his then lodgings in Sydney Street.

== Buildings ==
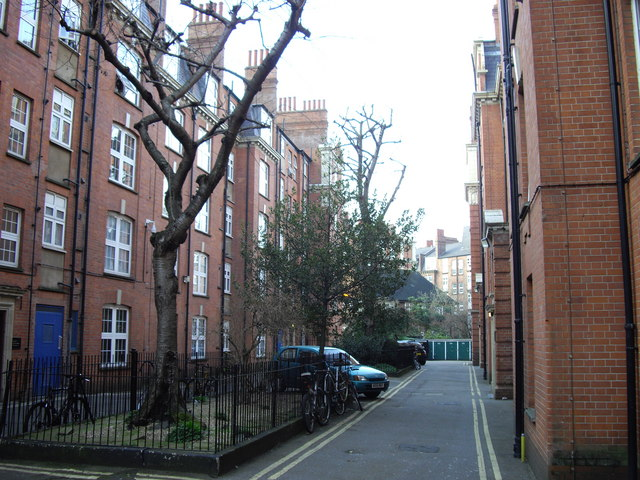
Two blocks of Sutton Dwellings between Cale Street and Ixworth Place, 2009

St Wilfred's Convent once stood in gardens on the north side at the western end, opposite where the Royal Brompton Hospital is now on the south side.

Also on the south side is St Luke's Church and gardens on the site of the former burial ground for Chelsea Old Church which is located further south near the Chelsea Embankment. The burial ground was consecrated in 1812 and had a 9-foot-high (2.7 m) wall and railings to protect against grave robbers. St Luke's was built between 1820 and 1824, over the vaults used by Chelsea Old Church, when the old church was felt to be too small for the population of the area. Its grounds were used for burials until 1857 before in 1881 they were converted to gardens. A new boundary for the church and part of the gardens was created using the gravestones from the burial ground. Today, the area to the north of the church adjacent to Cale Street is a recreation ground while the area to the south of the church adjacent to Britten Street is formal gardens.

Sutton Dwellings, an estate of housing association properties built in 1913 is on the north side of Cale Street, and was threatened with redevelopment, until the local council declared it a Conservation Area.

In the 1960s the fashion boutique Hung On You was at No. 22, run by the designer Michael Rainey and whose customers included the Beatles. The shop moved to Chelsea's King's Road in 1967.

Tom's Kitchen was a restaurant at No. 27 run by Tom Aikens from November 2006 to January 2020.
