= Jubilee Place, Chelsea =

Street in Chelsea, London

Coordinates: 51°29′23″N 0°09′58″W

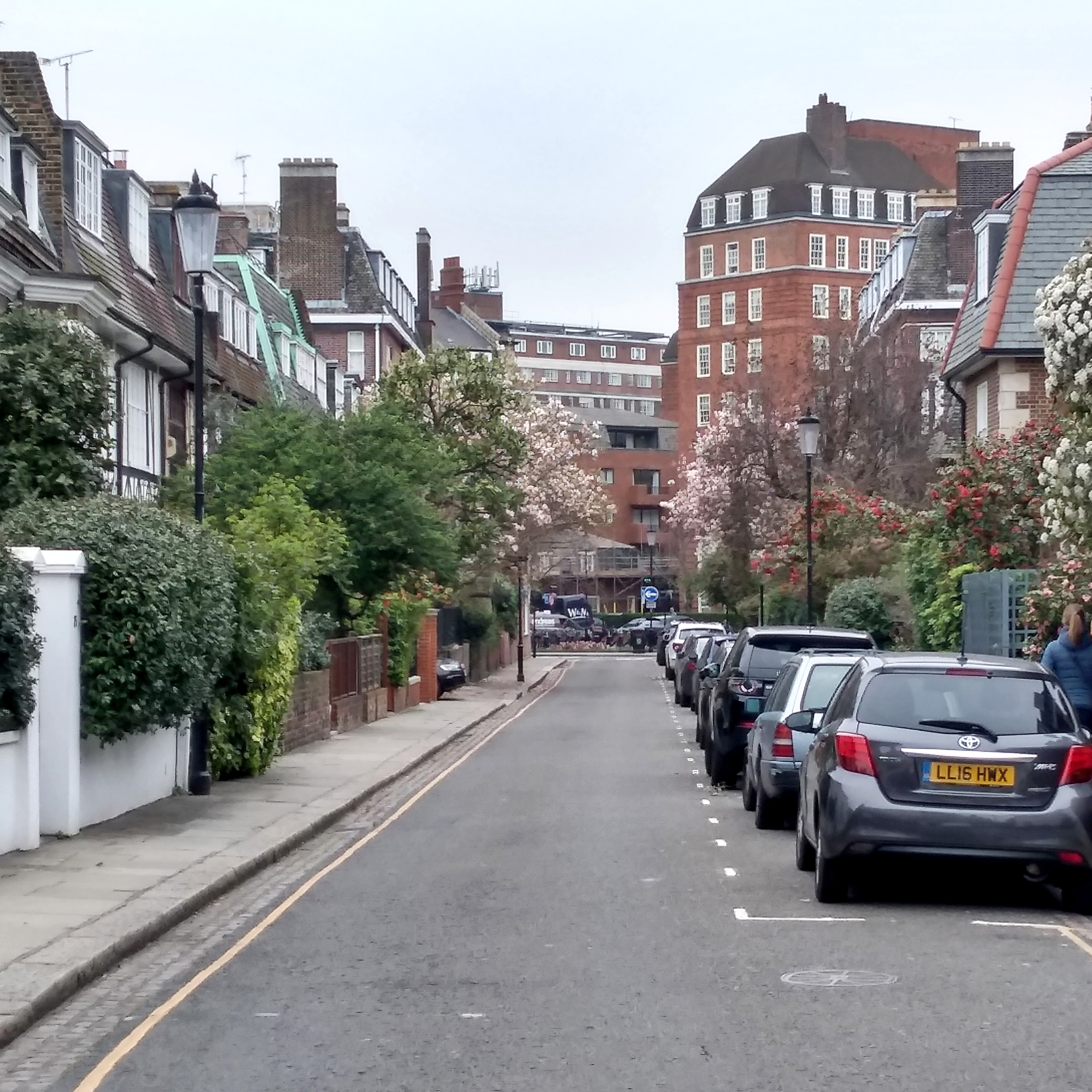
Jubilee Place, lloking north to Chelsea Green, in 2019

Jubilee Place is a street in Chelsea, London. It runs north to south from Cale Street and Chelsea Green to King's Road.

The first houses were built on the east side of the street in about 1809, and were largely complete by 1813, by when there was also a small row of houses on the west side.

Jubilee Cottages, nos 13-15 are Grade II listed.

In 1894, the artist Henry Charles Innes Fripp was living at 21 Joubert Mansions, Jubilee Place.

From about 1900 to 1930, the sculptor Felix Joubert was living at no.2.

In 1992, Kevin Maxwell and his wife Pandora were moved out of their six-bedroom house at no.36, then valued at £1.5 million. They were woken at 6:35am, Pandora being furious to be woken so early, especially with so many journalists outside.

The sculptor Grizel Niven (1906–2007), who created the figurine known as "The Bessie" awarded each year to the winner of the Women's Prize for Fiction, lived there alone in a council flat.

The modelling agency Storm Management is bassed at no.5.

In 2023, Cole & Son, a wallpaper design company founded in 1875, opened their flagship gallery at no.3. Coincidentally, this Victorian building had been constructed in 1888 specifically for wallpaper manufacturing.
