= Auriens =

Luxury retirement complex in Chelsea, London

Auriens is a retirement complex in Chelsea, London, in Dovehouse Street, overlooking Dovehouse Green and the King's Road.

Auriens is on the site of what was the London Borough of Kensington and Chelsea's only local authority care home. It was opened in 2021 and there 56 apartments, priced between £2.75 and £10.5 million.

The company was co-founded by Karen Mulville (wife of Jimmy Mulville) and Johnny Sandelson. Julie Fawcett was appointed as Chief Executive Officer of Auriens Group in November 2023.
