= Howard Leigh, Baron Leigh of Hurley =

British politician (born 1959)

The Right Honourable The Lord Leigh of Hurley
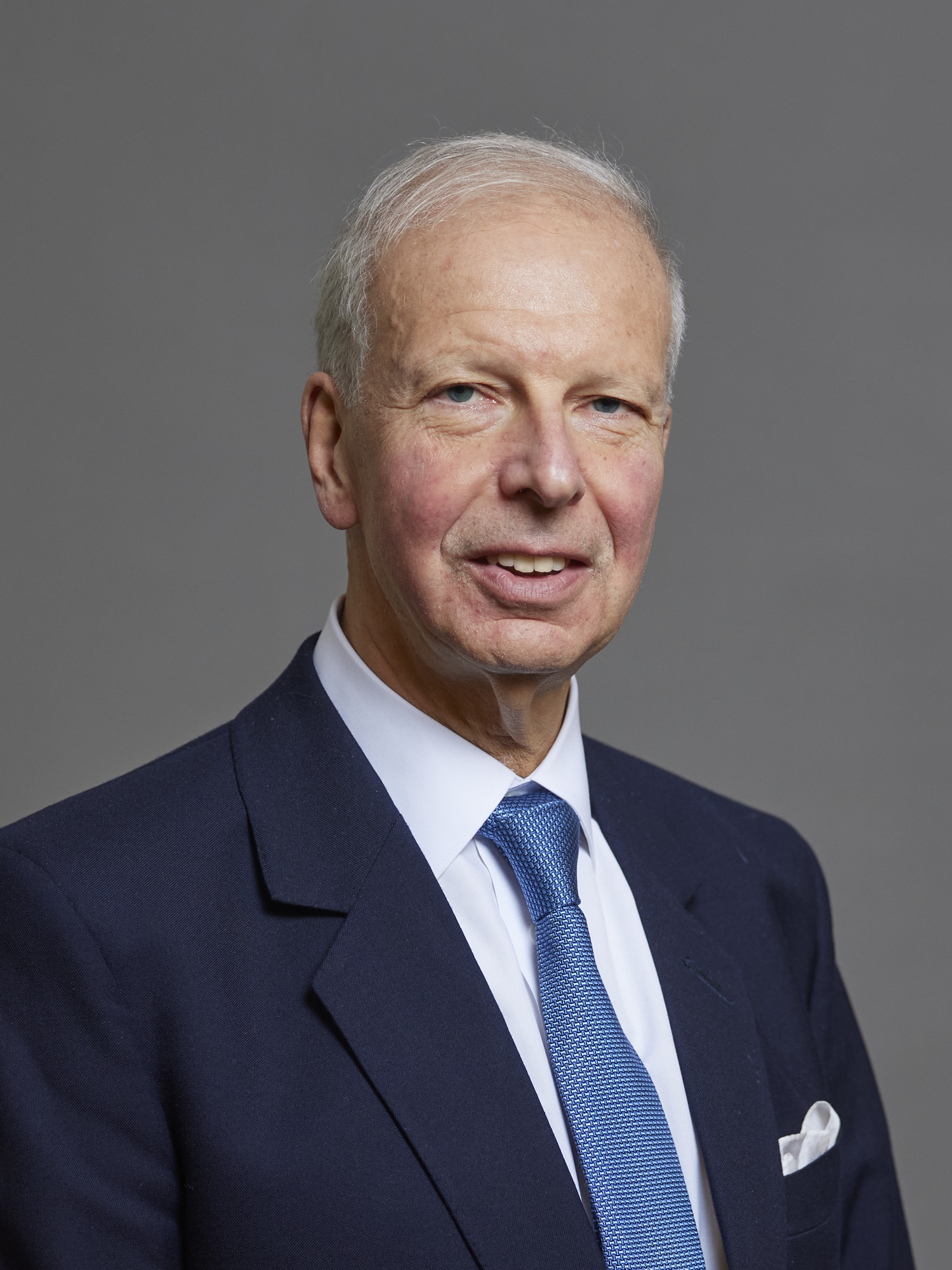
- Leigh in 2023

Member of the House of Lords
- Lord Temporal
- Life peerage 16 September 2013

Personal details
- Born: Howard Darryl Leigh; 3 April 1959 (age 67) London, England
- Party: Conservative
- Spouse: Jennifer Peach (m. 1998)
- Children: 2
- Parents: Philip Mark Leigh; Jacqueline Freeman
- Education: Clifton College, Bristol (Private boarding and day school); University of Southampton
- Occupation: Businessman

Howard Darryl Leigh, Baron Leigh of Hurley (born 3 April 1959) is a British businessman, Conservative Party politician, and since September 2013 a member of the House of Lords. He is the Co-founder and Senior Partner of Cavendish Corporate Finance.

Leigh was created a life peer on 16 September 2013 taking the title Baron Leigh of Hurley, of Hurley in the Royal County of Berkshire.

== Education ==
Leigh was educated at Clifton College, a private boarding and day school in Bristol, in South West England. From 1977 to 1980, he studied Economics at the University of Southampton.

== Life and career ==
After completing his studies, Leigh worked briefly at a British merchant bank. In September 1981, he joined the audit and consulting firm Deloitte Haskins Sells. There he worked as a tax consultant, moving to the Corporate Tax Department of Deloitte upon qualifying as a chartered accountant. During this time he completed additional training at the Chartered Institute of Taxation.

In the spring of 1986, Leigh built the Deloitte's Mergers and Acquisitions Group, a special department for corporate mergers and acquisitions, on. In May 1988 he left Deloitte Haskins Sells and together with his partner Hugo Haddon-Grant he founded Cavendish Corporate Finance LLP in the same month.

From 2000 to 2004 he was chair of the Faculty of Corporate Finance at the Institute of Chartered Accountants in England & Wales (ICAEW). In 2008 he received the "Outstanding Achievement in Corporate Finance Award" from the Faculty of Corporate Finance.

Since 1979, Lord Leigh supported the Conservative Party during election campaigns. ^{[5]} He was 2000–2005 Treasurer of the Conservative Party; He is since 2005 Alt-Treasurer (Senior Treasurer). ^{[1]} He is a member of the Executive Board of the Conservative Friends of Israel.

On 16 September 2013 he was elevated formally to life peer; he bears the title Baron Leigh of Hurley in the Royal County of Berkshire.

He was chairman and is currently president of Westminster Synagogue. On 11 July 2015 the Minister for Civil Society, Rob Wilson, appointed Lord Leigh to take part in a review of the self-regulation of fundraising of charities, which was published on 21 September 2015. Lord Leigh is vice-president of the Jewish Leadership Council and president of the Institute of Jewish Policy Research.

Lord Leigh is married to Jennifer Leigh and father to two daughters. He is an occasional jogger and has participated in several national and local half marathons (including the Henley Standard 10 km and the Water of Life marathon).

Orders of precedence in the United Kingdom
Preceded by The Lord Holmes of Richmond	Gentlemen; Baron Leigh of Hurley	Followed by The Lord Verjee
