= Sutton Dwellings =

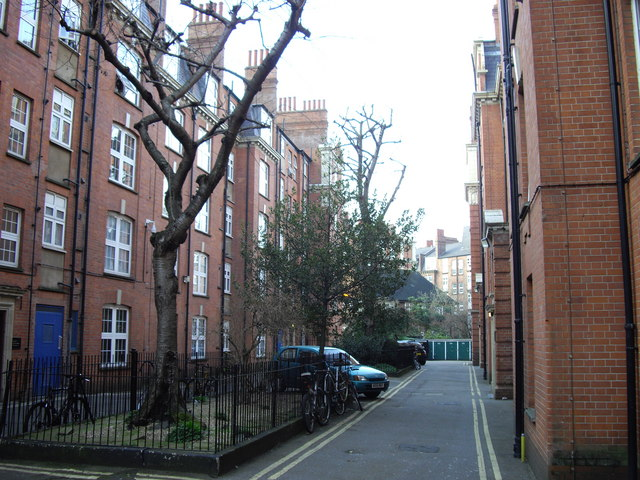
- Two blocks of Sutton Dwellings between Cale Street and Ixworth Place in 2009
- Interactive map of the Sutton Dwellings area

General information
- Type: Residential buildings
- Location: Chelsea, London, United Kingdom
- Coordinates: 51.4915°N 0.1691°W
- Completed: 1913
- Client: William Sutton Trust
- Owner: Affinity Sutton

Sutton Dwellings, also known as the Sutton Estate, are a series of 14 residential buildings in Chelsea, London, United Kingdom.

== History ==
At the beginning of the 20th century, the 4.5-acre area bounded by Leader Street (now known as Ixworth Place), Cale Street, and College Street (now known as Elystan Street) was home to many overcrowded small houses.

In 1908, the William Sutton Trust, established by philanthropist William Richard Sutton, purchased the area. They demolished the houses and built 14 red-brick residential buildings, designed by architect E.C.P. Monson, for social housing. The buildings, which housed 2,200 people in 764 apartments, were completed in 1913.

The buildings are currently owned by Clarion Housing Group, a housing association formed by the merger of Affinity Sutton, an affordable housing trust in London and owner of Sutton Estate, and Circle Housing in 2016. On 15 November 2015, Affinity Sutton submitted a planning application for a regeneration and demolition project that would see most of the estate's blocks (buildings A-K, N-O) replaced with new buildings containing a mix of private and social housing, reducing the number of social housing units by nearly a third. Residents accused the trust of "social cleansing", and in 2015 some of the inhabitants of the estate formed Save the Sutton Estate Ltd., a non-profit organisation whose main goal was to stop the demolition of the estate and further their alternative proposal for infill development and rehabilitation of existing units. In 2016, Clarion (Affinity) moved residents out of 159 flats and had workmen make the properties uninhabitable to squatters by smashing windows, doors, sinks and toilets in advance of a plan to demolish the buildings and replace them with 237 new social rent flats and 100 to be sold at market rate to support the redevelopment.

In November 2016, Kensington and Chelsea Borough Council rejected planning permission for the estate demolition and redevelopment application submitted by Clarion (Affinity Sutton) on the grounds that the net loss of social housing units was unacceptable. Save Our Sutton worked with Create Streets to develop an alternative master plan of infill and restoration and a public inquiry was held. In August 2017, it was suggested that the empty flats could temporarily house the survivors from the Grenfell Tower fire in North Kensington.

Clarion Housing Group appealed to the Secretary of State for Housing, Communities and Local Government against the decision by Kensington and Chelsea to reject their plan, arguing that they had revised their plans to increase the provision of social housing to avoid a net loss in social housing, and as such their original application (with revisions) should be approved. On 18 December 2018 the Secretary of State issued a decision refusing the appeal and upheld Kensington and Chelsea Council's view that an entirely new application would be required. Clarion voiced their upset at what they described as refusal on the grounds of a "technicality." During 2019 they conducted consultations on the creation of an entirely new plan for the development of the estate. Residents' year-long campaign against Clarion’s scheme recruited celebrity supporters including Chelsea resident actress Felicity Kendal and comedian Eddie Izzard. The alternative plan showed that a different approach was possible which retained the existing buildings. In August 2019 the estate was added to an existing conservation area, making them protected historic buildings by the Royal Borough of Kensington & Chelsea.

Finally in November 2019 Clarion Housing announced the four empty blocks would get a complete makeover, and at least 80 homes will be for social rent, with priority for existing Sutton estate residents. The remaining 303 flats will get new kitchens and bathrooms, and the grounds refurbished.
