= Grizel Niven =

English sculptor (1906–2007)

- Niven in 1991
- Born: Grizel Rosemary Graham Niven; 28 November 1906; Belgravia, London, England
- Died: 28 January 2007 (aged 100)
- Known for: Sculpture
- Notable work: Bessie, the award that is given to recipients of the Baileys Women's Prize for Fiction

Grizel Rosemary Graham Niven (28 November 1906 – 28 January 2007) was a British sculptor. She created the figurine presented to the winner of the annual Women's Prize for Fiction, formerly the Orange Prize for Fiction, since its inception in 1996. Known as "The Bessie", the trophy is cast each year with a different mixture of bronze, making each award unique.

Niven created abstract and figurative works in a variety of materials such as fibreglass, resin, paint, metal, Perspex, and hardboard. For several years, she was the resident sculptor at the Edith Grove Gallery in Chelsea, London, which held a solo retrospective of her work.

== Early life and education ==
Grizel Niven was born in Belgravia, London, in 1906, the third of four children of William Edward Graham Niven (1878–1915) and Henriette Degacher (1878–1932). Her elder siblings were Margaret Joyce Niven (1900–1981), Henry Degacher Niven (1902–1953), and her younger brother was the actor, writer and soldier David Niven (1910–1983). Grizel, pronounced "Grizzle", was described as "an odd Scots name" in her brother's authorised biography.

Niven's mother, Henriette, was born in Brecon, Wales. Her father was Captain (brevet Major) William Degacher (1841–1879) of the 1st Battalion, 24th Regiment of Foot, who was killed at the Battle of Isandlwana during the Anglo-Zulu War in 1879. Although born William Hitchcock, in 1874, he and his older brother Lieutenant Colonel Henry Degacher (1835–1902), both followed their father, Walter Henry Hitchcock, in taking their mother's maiden name of Degacher. Henriette's mother was Julia Caroline Smith, the daughter of Lieutenant General James Webber Smith CB.

Niven's father, a lieutenant in the Berkshire Yeomanry of Scottish descent, was killed in action in Turkey during the Gallipoli Campaign of the First World War on 21 August 1915. In 2002, Niven recalled "I remember my father only very slightly" and "He seldom came home and we weren't all that close as a family." Of her mother, she said, "We always had a nurse or governess, but I don't know what [mother] did all day. She didn't do any work or painting, cooking or gardening." Grizel and her brother David were close as siblings, and both suspected that William was not their real father. Following his death their mother remarried in 1917 to diplomat and Conservative politician Sir Thomas Walter Comyn-Platt (1869–1961), whom Grizel said they disliked intensely. Literary editor and biographer, Graham Lord, wrote in Niv: The Authorised Biography of David Niven, that Thomas Comyn-Platt and Henriette Niven may have been in an affair well before her husband's death in 1915 and that Comyn-Platt was actually David Niven's biological father, a supposition that had some support among David's siblings. In a review of Lord's book, Hugh Massingberd from The Spectator stated photographic evidence did show a strong physical resemblance between David Niven and Comyn-Platt that "would appear to confirm these theories, though photographs can often be misleading." David is said to have revealed that he knew Comyn-Platt was his real father a year before his own death in 1983.

The family moved to Rose Cottage in Bembridge on the Isle of Wight after selling their London home, where Grizel and David played cricket and sailed in a dinghy during school holidays. Grizel Niven attended boarding school in Norfolk. She discovered her love of carpentry when she had to make a set of wooden steps for the school library. In 1930, Niven graduated from the Royal Academy of Dramatic Art (RADA) with a diploma in Acting. Following a brief career in theatre, she studied sculpture with Henry Moore at Chelsea Polytechnic.

== Career ==
=== Acting ===
After completing her studies at RADA, Niven joined a touring theatre group, acting alongside Jean Anderson, Robert Morley, and Sir John Clements. In 1929, Niven's portrayal of Dolly Sales in the touring production of Many Waters was called out as "worthy of note". She once shared a stage with Dame Edith Evans in the West End, playing her maid.

=== Sculpture ===
As a sculptor, Niven was influenced by the abstract figures of Henry Moore, although she also created portrait sculptures including a "naturalistic" bust of her brother David. She perfected a technique to create wall sculptures made of fibreglass, resin and paint. Her interest in architecture and the way that light is reflected off buildings led her to experiment with metal strips on Perspex or card; she also created black-and-white paintings and drawings which she called Catoptrics.

Niven was one of 20 finalists in The Unknown Political Prisoner competition in 1953. In 1959, Niven, in collaboration with architect Paul Clinton, was awarded a £100 prize for one the six best designs in an international competition for the memorial sculpture at the Dachau Concentration Camp. Their entry, the only one from England, was described as "an open square surrounded by a double wall of dark grey stone with the sculpture of two hands reaching for the sky in the centre". The prize was eventually won by Nandor Glid (the son of parents murdered in Auschwitz) in 1967.

In 1980, Niven's studio in Fulham was broken into by a burglar who stole valuables, including her carving tools for wood and stone, and smashed everything in sight. Although some works which had been hidden were recovered and some were repaired, she lost the will to work for several months.

Her work was shown in group exhibitions at the Royal Academy of Arts, as part of The London Group, and around the world. When Niven was in her eighties, her work was featured in a solo retrospective at the Edith Grove Gallery in Chelsea, which continued for several years; she became known as the gallery's "resident sculptor". She also had a solo exhibition at The Place. The Courtauld Institute of Art holds information about Niven's work. Her Abstract Figure (1991) is in the collection of the Harris Museum in Preston.

=== "The Bessie" ===
Niven heard Kate Mosse talking on BBC Radio 4's Woman's Hour about setting up a Women's Prize for Fiction, and had her representative call Mosse to offer a cast of a sculpture of hers as a trophy. The bronze Bessie figurine itself is 7.5 inches (19 cm) high. Each year, the sculpture is recast with a different mixture of bronze, making each trophy unique. Mosse once stated that the reason behind the name "Bessie" is that it is the first name of the benefactress of the annual £30,000 award, who wished to remain anonymous.

When Bessie debuted as the Orange Women's Prize for Fiction trophy in 1996, The Daily Telegraph described it as "what sounds like a frightfully politically incorrect bauble – a bronze statuette of a nude woman, boasting prominent breasts". In 2001, critic Helen Brown described the statuette in the same paper as "a small, female figure with a surface texture resembling the inside of a golf ball and peculiarly high-sitting breasts". Brown quoted 2000 prize winner Linda Grant as saying, "When I got the Bessie I thought 'Oh God, what an ugly thing!' But now the more I look at her, the more I enjoy looking at her. She's on my mantelpiece as a concrete symbol of success".

== Personal life ==
Niven remained close to her brother David throughout his life, accompanying him to dinner with Elizabeth Taylor and producer Mike Todd, and to drinks with Jackie and John F. Kennedy before he became president. David died in 1983 of motor neurone disease, leaving her £60,000. In 1993, Grizel held an exhibition in Chelsea as a fundraiser for the Motor Neurone Disease Association. In 2002, she was interviewed by Graham Lord as a source for David's biography titled Niv.

Niven was a lesbian with a long-term partner. Although David had bought her a house on Fulham Road, she disliked it, and lived alone for many years in a council flat on Jubilee Place in Chelsea. She later moved to a care home in Hammersmith. She died on 28 January 2007, aged 100.
