= Johnny Sandelson =

British property developer (born 1968)

- Born: Jonathan Charles David Sandelson; 1968 (age 57–58)
- Occupation: property developer
- Parent(s): Victor Lightman Sandelson; Bernice Sandelson
- Relatives: Neville Sandelson (uncle); Robert Sandelson (brother)

Jonathan Charles David Sandelson (born 1968) is a British property developer and an investor in The Strategic Iconic Assets Heritage Acquisition Fund (SIAHAF).

== Early life ==
Johnny Sandelson was born into a Jewish family, the son of Victor Lightman Sandelson (1928–2017) and Bernice Sandelson. He has a brother Robert Sandelson, and two sisters, Antonia and Jo. His father was an art collector and arts journalist, and his mother was an artist. His uncle (Victor's older brother) was the Labour Party MP Neville Sandelson (1923–2002), who was a co-founder of the Social Democratic Party (SDP).

== Career ==
In 2003, Sandelson founded GuestInvest with Sir Mark Weinberg, and the company bought hotels and sought to sell 999-year leases on individual rooms for £300,000 to £1 million as investments. GuestInvest went into administration in 2008, with investors "concerned that they may not get their money back", as it was not regulated by the Financial Services Authority (FSA). In 2008, GuestInvest owned six hotels including Blakes Hotel, Nest and The Jones, both near Hyde Park, and the Chiswell Street Hotel, all in London.

Sandelson is one of the principals behind the recent acquisition of large parts of the Queensway district of West London. He was said to have masterminded the acquisition of Whiteleys and is continuing in partnership with Meyer Bergman on the development of a number of buildings within the Queensway Estate.

Sandelson's previous projects include the Carlyon Bay redevelopment project in St Austell, Cornwall; the acquisition and redevelopment of Somerset Place in Bath where, over 5 years, he oversaw the restoration and redevelopment of a Georgian crescent of houses and apartments, all Grade I listed properties; and the HBOS-backed hotel investment brand GuestInvest which was a high-profile casualty of the downturn in the UK commercial property market in 2007.

In 2015, also in partnership with Meyer Bergman and advised by Savills, Sandelson completed the £250m Project Soya portfolio of sites in Tolworth, Woolwich and Kensington which was recognised as Deal of the Year in the 2016 RESI awards. Sandelson achieved planning consent for the Jericho Wharf site on the Oxford Canal. Also in 2015, Sandelson acquired for £80m the Mayfair building of Thomas Goode & Co., which continued to occupy the building as a tenant.

In May 2016, Sandelson co-founded (with Karen Mulville) a high-end care home business, Auriens, with its first development in Chelsea, London due to open in 2019.

In February 2018, together with his brother Robert Sandelson, he acquired the British Art Fair, formerly known as the 20/21 British Art Fair. The Fair has been running for 30 years, and will have a new home at the Saatchi Gallery as part of a major investment by its new owners.
