= Grosvenor Chapel =

Coordinates: 51.5090°N 0.1514°W

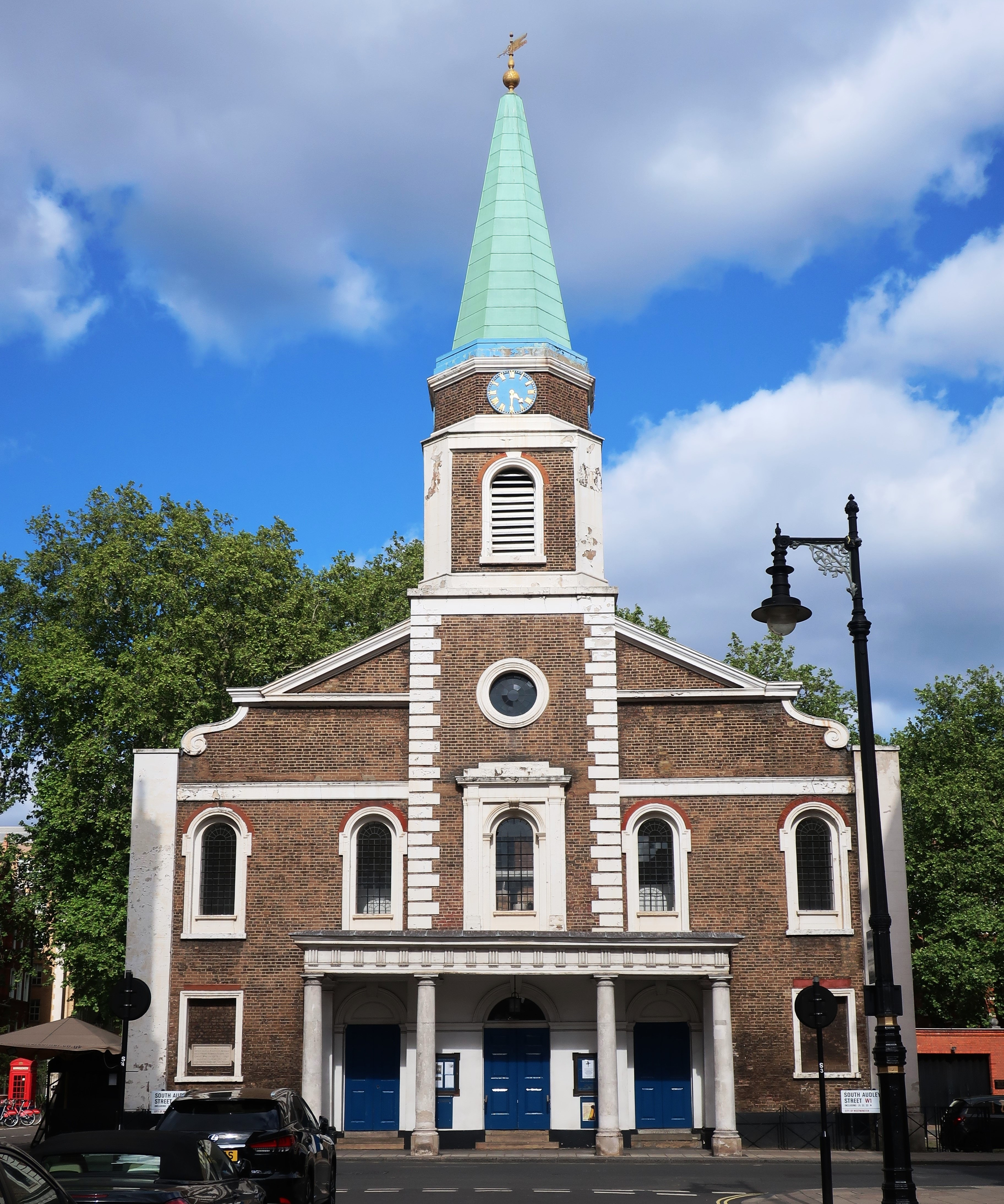
- Grosvenor Chapel
- OS grid reference: TQ 28397 80520
- Location: London
- Country: England
- Denomination: Church of England
- Tradition: Anglo-Catholic / Liberal Catholic
- Website: www.grosvenorchapel.org.uk

Architecture
- Heritage designation: Grade II*
- Architect: Benjamin Timbrell
- Style: Classical
- Years built: April 1731

Administration
- Division: Deanery of Westminster (St Margaret)
- Diocese: Diocese of London
- Parish: St George's, Hanover Square

Clergy
- Priest: The Revd Dr Alan Piggot (Assistant Priest)

Grosvenor Chapel is an Anglican church in what is now the City of Westminster, in England, built in the 1730s. It inspired many churches in New England. It is situated on South Audley Street in Mayfair.

== History ==
The foundation stone of the Grosvenor Chapel was laid on 7 April 1730 by Sir Richard Grosvenor, 4th Baronet, owner of the surrounding property, who had leased the site for 99 years at a peppercorn rent to a syndicate of four "undertakers" led by Benjamin Timbrell, a prosperous local builder.

The new building was completed and ready to use by April 1731.

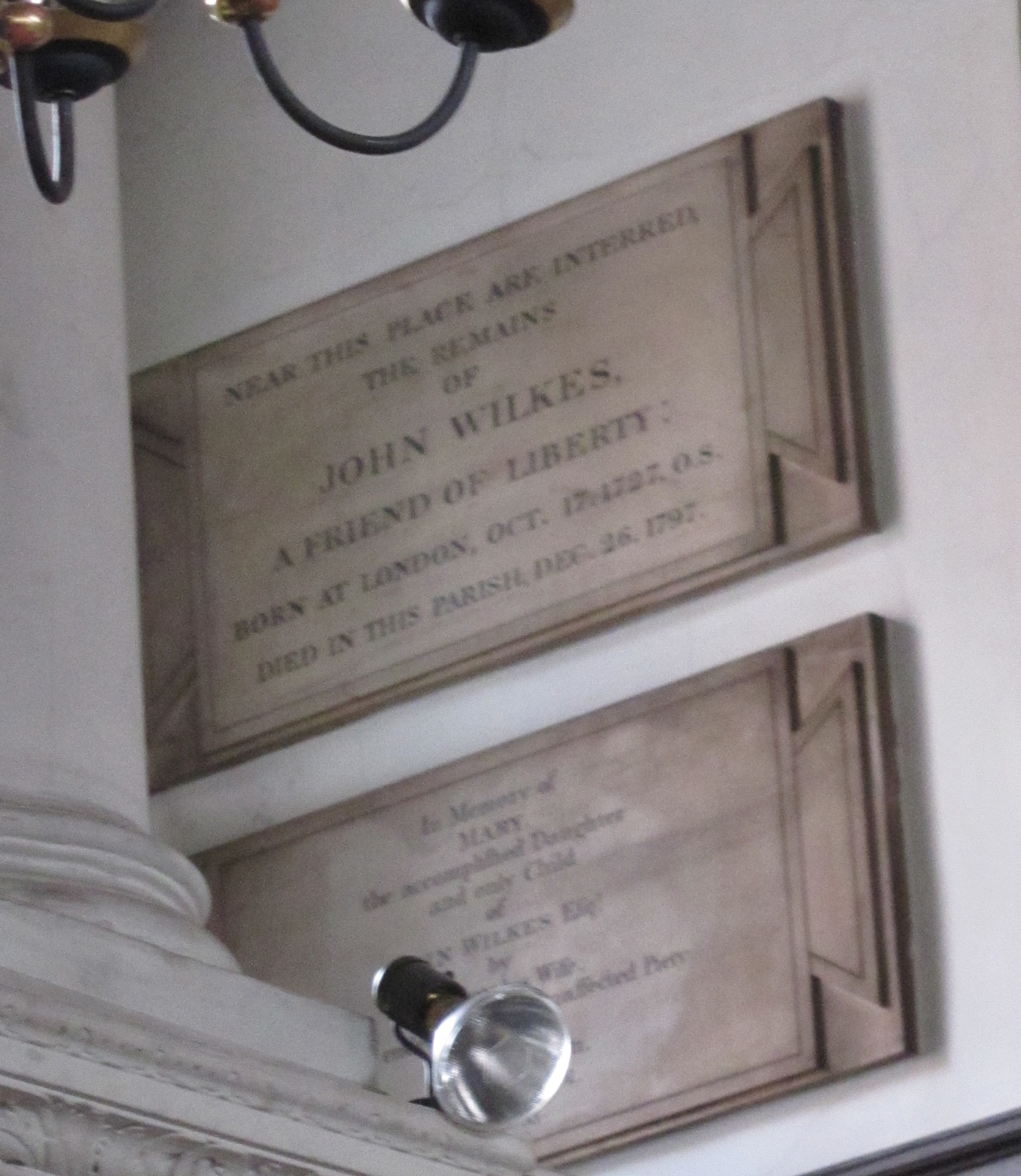
John Wilkes' plaque (and his daughter Mary's, below), in the chapel's upstairs gallery.

Grosvenor Chapel Act 1831
- Act of Parliament
- Parliament of the United Kingdom
- Long title: An Act for the Establishment of a Chapel of Ease, to be called Grosvenor Chapel, in the Parish of Saint George Hanover Square in the County of Middlesex, and for providing for the Maintenance of the said Chapel, and a Stipend for the Minister thereof.
- Citation: 1 & 2 Will. 4. c. iii

Dates
- Royal assent: 30 July 1831
Other legislation
Repealed by	Grosvenor Chapel Act 1899

Status: Repealed

Text of statute as originally enacted

After the original 99-year lease ran out in 1829 the Grosvenor Chapel Act 1831 (1 & 2 Will. 4. c. iii) brought the chapel within the parochial system as a chapel of ease to St George's, Hanover Square.

The chapel has been the spiritual home to a number of famous people including John Wilkes, Lady Mary Wortley Montagu, Garret Wesley, 1st Earl of Mornington, and his wife (parents to the Duke of Wellington), Florence Nightingale, US General Dwight D. Eisenhower and Bishop Charles Gore.

During the Second World War, men and women of the American armed forces were welcomed to the chapel for their Sunday services, as recorded on a tablet outside the west wall, and after the war the congregation regularly included such people as the writer Rose Macaulay and Sir John Betjeman, Poet Laureate from 1972 until his death in 1984.

== Building ==
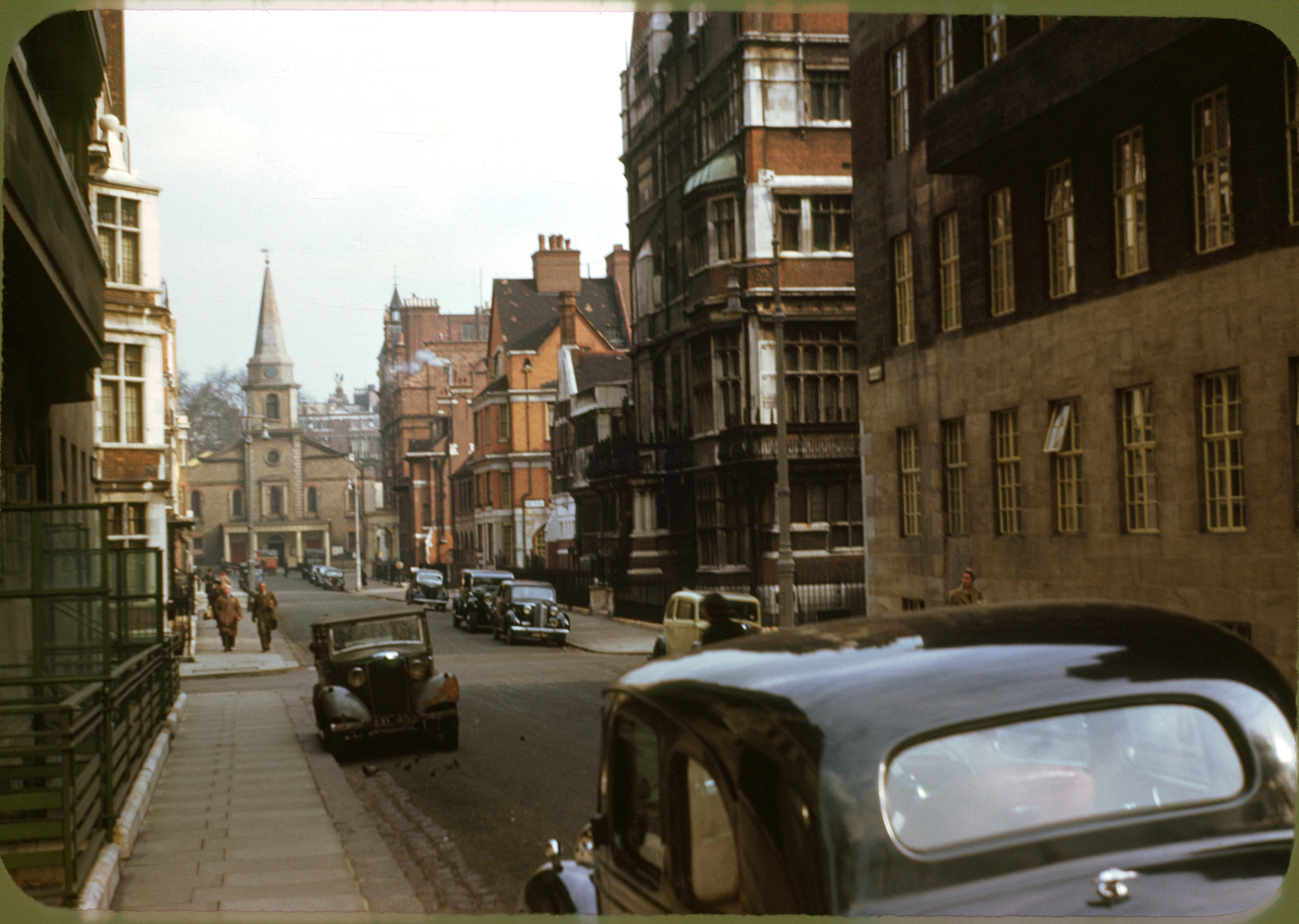
Grosvenor Chapel viewed from Aldford St, circa 1949

The simple classical form of the building, a plain rectangular box with two tiers of arched windows in the side walls, at the east a shallow projection for the communion table and at the west a portico over the pavement and a short spire containing a clock and bell to call the faithful to worship, is derived from recently completed churches such as James Gibbs’ St Martin in the Fields or John James' St George's, Hanover Square. With the aid of these examples and the illustrations in numerous pattern books available at the time, a competent builder like Timbrell, who had worked with Gibbs at St Martin's, could himself have easily produced the design for the chapel without needing to commission an architect. The Anglo-Catholic liturgical style of the chapel was expressed in the building by the introduction of fittings and adornments by Ninian Comper in 1912–1913.

== Music ==
The organ in Grosvenor Chapel was built by Abraham Jordan and installed in 1732 at the expense of Sir Richard Grosvenor, 4th Baronet. It was altered twice in the 19th century by Bishop, and rebuilt in 1908 by Ingram. In 1930 J. W. Walker & Sons built a new, two-manual organ incorporating much second-hand pipework both from the old instrument and from elsewhere. This instrument was replaced in 1991 by William Drake, Organ Builder of Buckfastleigh, Devon, who built a new organ in a broadly 18th-century English style.

A specification of the organ can be found on the National Pipe Organ Register.

The chapel enjoys a high standard of music with a resident professional group of five singers and an organist. The group is often augmented with other singers and instrumentalists for special occasions including an orchestra for Easter Day. The choir performs a large range of music from Renaissance to the present day.

There are regular free lunchtime concerts on Tuesdays at 1:10 pm.

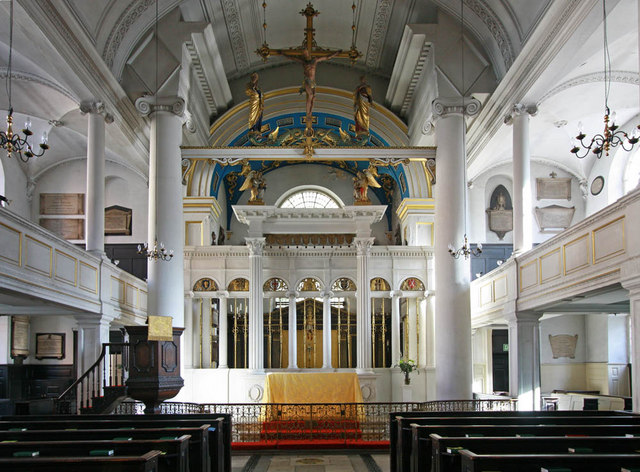
East end, Grosvenor Chapel

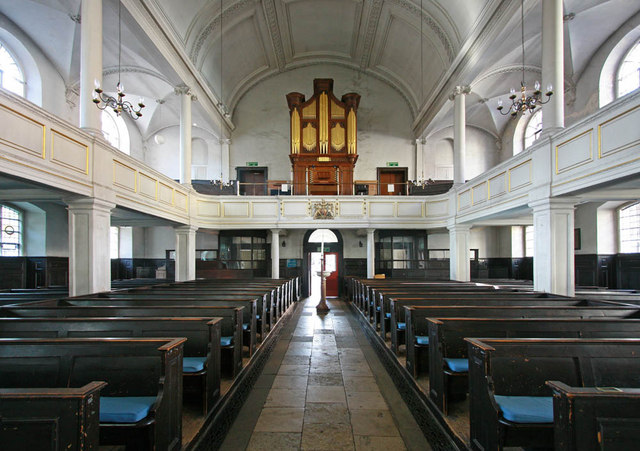
West end, Grosvenor Chapel

== Notable clergy ==
Curates-in-Charge

The senior priest at Grosvenor Chapel was previously known as the Curate-in-Charge

- 1941 to 1943: The Revd Cecil Wood
- 1944 to unknown: The Revd G. G. Pearson
- 1968 to 1979: The Revd John Bernard Gaskell
- 1980 to 1992: The Revd Dr Anthony Wendt "Tony" Marks
- 1994 to 2008: The Revd Simon Hobbs

Priests-in-Charge

Since 2006, the senior priest at Grosvenor Chapel is the Priest-in-Charge.

- 2008 to 2010: The Revd Mark Oakley
- 2012 to 2023: The Revd Dr Richard Fermer
- 2023 to present: Fr Stephen Coleman

== Burials ==
- Richard Lumley, 2nd Earl of Scarbrough
- John Wilkes
- Lady Mary Wortley Montagu
- Willem van Keppel, 2nd Earl of Albemarle
- John Huske

== Popular culture ==
The wedding at the start of the Richard Curtis film Love Actually takes place in the Grosvenor Chapel.
