= Beefeater Gin =

Brand of gin

Beefeater
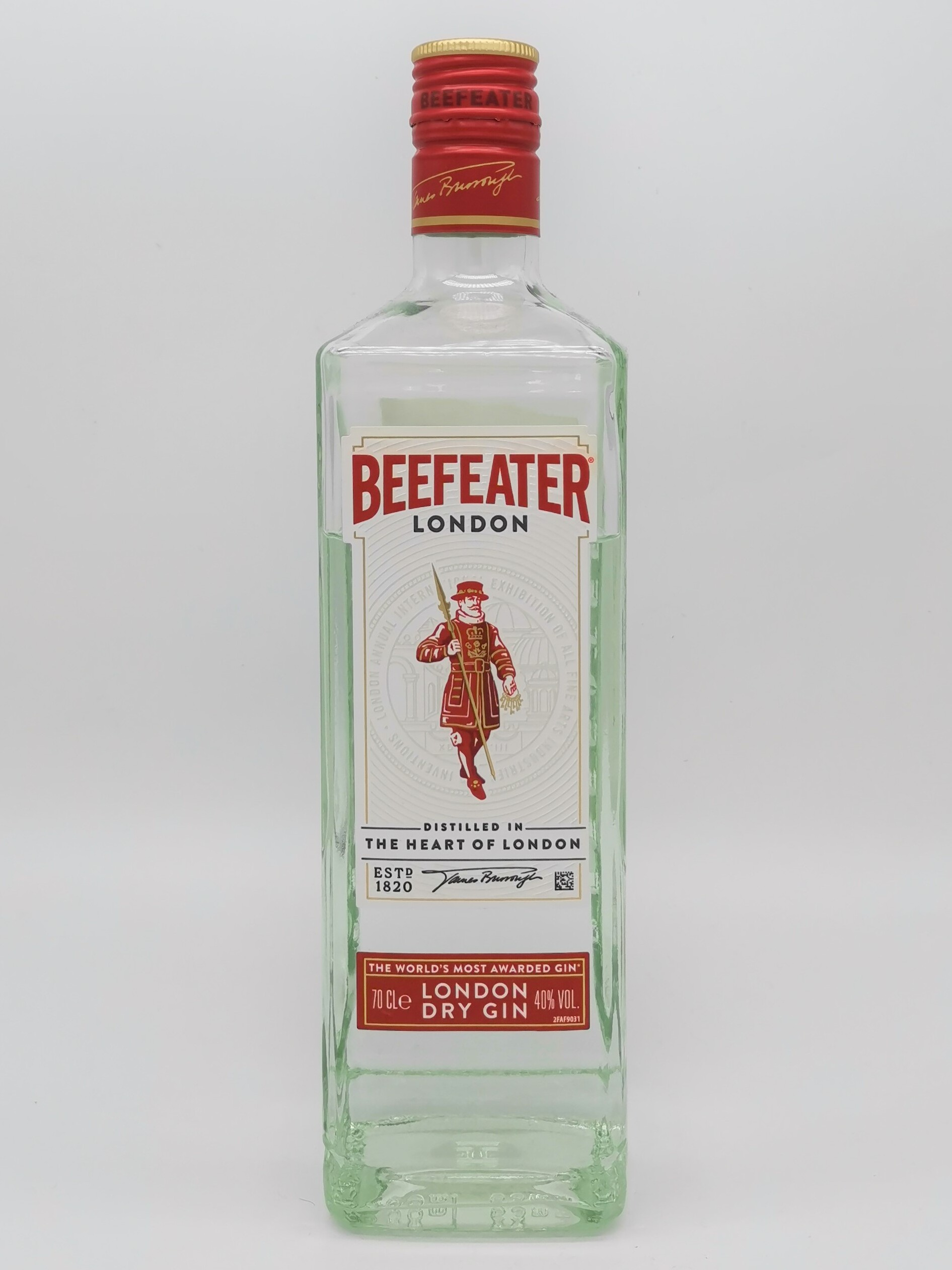
- Type: Gin
- Manufacturer: James Burrough Ltd.
- Distributor: Pernod Ricard
- Origin: London, United Kingdom
- Introduced: 1876
- Alcohol by volume: 40%
- Proof (US): 80.0
- Colour: Clear
- Flavour: Juniper
- Variants: Beefeater 24; Beefeater Crown Jewel; Beefeater 0.0%
- Website: www.beefeatergin.com

Beefeater Gin is a brand of London dry gin owned by Pernod Ricard, bottled and distributed in the United Kingdom. The brand remained under the control of its founding Burrough family until 1987. The Beefeater distillery is one of 24 operating in London.

The name refers to the Yeomen of the Guard, the ceremonial bodyguards of the British monarch.

== Production ==
Beefeater is produced from 100% grain spirit. The manufacturer has been in business since 1863 and its distillery is located in Kennington, London.

According to the brand, Beefeater Gin contains nine botanicals: juniper, angelica root, angelica seed, coriander seed, liquorice, almond, orris root, Seville oranges, and lemon peel.

Beefeater 24, a super-premium version of the gin, was launched in 2009 with three additional botanicals: Chinese green tea, Japanese sencha, and grapefruit peel. The "24" in the name refers to the 24-hour steeping process of the botanicals prior to distillation. It is bottled at 45% ABV.

Beefeater also produces several flavoured gins, each bottled at 37.5% ABV.

In January 2024, Pernod Ricard launched Beefeater 0.0%, an alcohol-free (0.04% ABV) botanical alternative created by adding the essence of Beefeater's London Dry recipe to a non-alcoholic base. It first went on sale in Spain—the brand's largest global market—before expanding to 27 international markets, including Canada, Italy, and the United Kingdom.

== History ==
Beefeater's origins trace back to 1862, when James Burrough (born 1835) bought the Cale Street-based Chelsea distillery from rectifier and compounder John Taylor for £400 (equivalent to £42,100 in 2025). By 1863, Burrough had begun producing his own distinctive style of gin. Initially, the distillery continued producing the liqueurs established by its previous owners, which helped build its reputation and expand its customer base.

Company stock lists from 1876 show an expanding portfolio of gins under brand names such as Ye Old Chelsea and James Burrough London Dry, as well as Old Tom styles. Through experimentation and the adoption of new processes, Burrough discovered that blending a specific recipe of botanicals produced a bold, full-flavoured gin, which he named Beefeater Gin.

Following its immediate success, Beefeater soon became the James Burrough Company's flagship product. The original Beefeater recipe book, dated 1895, specifies the nine botanicals essential to creating the gin's distinct, full-bodied flavour: juniper, angelica root, angelica seed, coriander seed, liquorice, almond, orris root, Seville orange, and lemon peel.

The brand remained under the ownership of the James Burrough Company until 1987, when, under the direction of Norman Burrough, the firm was purchased by Whitbread.

Long sold in the United States at 47% ABV, the gin's alcohol content in that market was reduced to 44% in late 2020, and further reduced to 40% ABV in 2023.

=== Lambeth ===
As the James Burrough Company underwent rapid expansion, it required increased distilling capacity. In 1908, a larger Beefeater distillery was built in Lambeth.

=== Kennington ===
In 1958, production moved to Kennington, London. English still manufacturer John Dore & Co. was commissioned to produce a larger set of copper pot stills replicating those used at the former Chelsea distillery.

In February 2013, Pernod Ricard announced construction of a visitor centre at the Kennington distillery site.

The steeping and distillation methods devised by James Burrough in the 1860s, along with his original recipe, remain virtually unchanged.

== Marketing ==
In July 2026, Beefeater launched a global advertising campaign titled "Get More With 0.0" to promote its relatively new alcohol-free Beefeater 0.0% variant. Created by advertising agency Lucky Generals, the campaign partnered with English acid jazz band Jamiroquai to coincide with the 30th anniversary of their multiple-award-winning music video "Virtual Insanity". Directed by Julien & Quentin and choreographed by Jamiroquai frontman Jay Kay, the commercial recreated the original video's shifting-floor set using physical in-camera effects rather than computer-generated imagery. The advertisement humorously reveals that Kay's iconic reaching gesture toward the camera in the original 1996 video was actually him reaching for a bottle of Beefeater 0.0%.

== Reviews ==
Typically considered a mid-range gin, Beefeater's standard London Dry has generally performed well at international spirit ratings competitions. Between 2006 and 2012, it earned one double gold, two gold, two silver, and two bronze medals at the San Francisco World Spirits Competition. It also received scores of 93 and 94 from the Beverage Testing Institute in 2005, 2008, and 2009. The premium Beefeater 24 has similarly earned accolades, including a gold medal at the 2010 San Francisco World Spirits Competition and silver medals in 2011 and 2012.
