= Building Tomorrow =

Social-profit organization

- Founded: 2006
- Founder: George Srour and Joseph B. Kaliisa
- Type: International social impact organization
- Purpose: Education
- Location: Indianapolis, Indiana; Kampala, Uganda; Kigali, Rwanda
- Region served: East Africa
- Services: Primary remedial education
- Website: buildingtomorrow.org

Building Tomorrow (BT) is a social-impact non-governmental organization operating in East Africa. Its mission is community-powered learning, with a vision of literacy and numeracy for all children. Building Tomorrow works to build foundational literacy and numeracy skills for primary-aged learners and strengthen educational systems through a data-backed, community-centered, and locally led model. Its signature Roots to Rise program, which combines elements of targeted instruction, structured pedagogy, social-emotional learning, and Universal Design for Learning has reached more than 1.3 million children.

== History ==
In 2004, Building Tomorrow Co-Founder and Chief Dreamer George Srour visited Uganda during a summer internship with the World Food Program, where he was struck by the country's need for educational infrastructure, as well as classroom overcrowding. Upon returning to university at the College of William and Mary, Srour decided that he would commit himself to redressing the education infrastructure problem he witnessed in Uganda.

Srour raised the funds from fellow university students to construct a new building for Meeting Point Kampala, becoming Building Tomorrow's first school. In 2006, Srour partnered with Joseph Kaliisa to officially found Building Tomorrow. From 2006 to 2015, the organization focused on school construction, building 23 primary schools in villages where none previously existed, with the approach of community-driven engagement to ensure local ownership and buy-in. To date, Building Tomorrow and community partners have built 87 schools.

Starting in 2015, Building Tomorrow shifted its focus from school construction to improving learning outcomes. The organization hired its first cohort of Building Tomorrow Fellows –recent university graduates – to deploy in rural communities and enroll out-of-school children in school. In 2018, Building Tomorrow piloted its signature literacy and numeracy program, Roots to Rise, introducing the program to 70 schools in 2019. In 2022, in response to the extended school closures in Uganda due to the COVID-19 pandemic, Building Tomorrow launched a community component of Roots to Rise, enabling children to receive the program beyond the classroom and implemented by Community Education Volunteers.

In 2025, Building Tomorrow partnered with the government of Rwanda to launch Roots to Rise programming in its second country, starting in Ngorerero District.

In March 2026, the organization reached its one millionth learner with Roots to Rise since first piloting the program in 2018.

== Model ==
Building Tomorrow's vision is to provide literacy and numeracy for all children. To achieve this, Building Tomorrow supports community-based education in East Africa, with its literacy and numeracy program Roots to Rise.

=== Roots to Rise ===
Roots to Rise (R2R) is Building Tomorrow's remedial literacy and numeracy program, which blends targeted instruction and structured pedagogy and is delivered by trained school teachers and Community Education Volunteers (CEVs) over 40 total hours in schools and communities. R2R also incorporates Universal Design for Learning and social-emotional learning frameworks to ensure inclusive education opportunities for all children. The program targets primary-aged children in need of remedial support, helping girls and boys to improve their foundational literacy and numeracy skills to set them up to succeed in school. Eligible learners undergo an assessment to determine their learning level before being placed in a R2R camp and receive periodic assessments over the course of 40 hours.

=== Community Education Teams ===
With Building Tomorrow's remedial R2R program central to its work and mission, Community Education Teams (CETs)–Building Tomorrow Fellows, teachers, trained CEVs, and local leaders–support education mobilization in communities. Together, CETs conduct R2R camps, enroll out-of-school children, and support greater learning outcomes in their communities.

Building Tomorrow Fellows are recent university graduates who represent BT's core field team, participating in a two-year Fellowship where they live and work in last-mile communities. Fellows are competitively selected for the program and participate in leadership and program-specific training before their deployment. Once deployed, Fellows work to build relationships with the community, assess barriers to education in the area, and train school teachers and CEVs to implement R2R. Fellows themselves do not implement the signature program, but instead provide support to teachers and CEVs, as well as assist with out-of-school enrollment. This community-powered model of education has significantly reduced learning poverty for the children enrolled in its programming. The efficacy of CEVs as implementers has been validated in a randomized controlled trial.

Working alongside R2R-trained teachers as the community implementor, CEVs are local residents who are passionate about education. CEVs can be former teachers, religious leaders, farmers, or other trusted adults in the community. BT trains R2R CEVs to carry out R2R community camps after class or during school breaks, as well as CEBS CEVs to help children learn helpful life skills. As local leaders, CEVs help ensure sustainability of the programming even after Fellows have left.

=== Government partnership ===
BT partners with central, regional, and local governments to support broader education systems with the primary goal to have government be the ultimate doer at scale, promoting lower costs and sustainability of its programming. To support this goal, BT forms memoranda of understanding with government actors to assess needs, develop strategies to reverse learning poverty, mobilize communities, and train R2R implementers.

=== Memoranda of Understanding ===
==== Uganda ====
- Ministry of Education and Sports
- Ministry of Finance, Planning, and Economic Development
- Ministry of Gender, Labor, and Social Development

==== Rwanda ====
- Ministry of Education

=== Geographies ===
Building Tomorrow currently operates programming in Uganda and Rwanda. Its R2R programming began in Uganda and is now carried out in dozens of districts across the country. In 2025, Building Tomorrow expanded to Rwanda, deploying its first cohort of Fellows to Ngorerero District.

== Impact and Recognitions ==
=== Evidence ===
Building Tomorrow is a leader in the field of last-mile foundational literacy and numeracy program implementation, with its programming rooted in data and evidence.

In 2021, Building Tomorrow partnered with Youth Impact to carry out a randomized controlled trial that tested the effectiveness of low-tech interventions to address learning loss during the COVID-19 pandemic. As one of five global replications, the Building Tomorrow trial was the only one to use CEVs as instructors. The research was conducted during the period of pandemic school closures in Uganda and found that CEVs delivering 160 minutes of SMS and phone-based tutoring helped children gain the equivalent of over one year of high-quality schooling.

In 2023, researchers from the University of Notre Dame, Tufts University, and Arizona State University conducted a randomized controlled trial that studied the impact of Building Tomorrow's programming. Initial results demonstrated that the average 4th-grade learner in Building Tomorrow-supported schools made 40% more math progress than the average student in the control group. The researchers also found Building Tomorrow's Fellows and CEVs make existing school staff more productive.

Building Tomorrow is currently partnered with the Numeracy and Research and Development (NRD) Fund project, a research project managed by Genesis Analytics and funded by the Gates Foundation, the Hempel Foundation, and Founders Pledge. Selected as one of eight organizations working with local governments across sub-Saharan Africa, and representing the Uganda arm, the project looks to improve foundational numeracy instruction and remedial support.

=== Awards ===
==== 2025 ====
- Library of Congress Literacy Awards, International Prize Winner

==== 2024 ====
- Selected as a coalition partner for USAID's 2025-2029 Targeting the Learning Crisis Project
- Building Tomorrow's CEVs honored as a top 100 innovation in education by HundrED and were spotlighted in HundrED's Global Collection 2025 Report
- 2024 Klaus J. Jacobs Best Practice Prize finalist
- Announced a Commitment to Action at the Clinton Global Initiative 2024 Annual Meeting to enroll 1,000,000 learners in foundational literacy and numeracy programming by 2028

==== 2023 ====
- Library of Congress Awards Program Successful Practices Honoree

==== Pre-2023 ====
- In 2007, BT was named one of the top 20 up-and-coming social change organizations in the world by Echoing Green
- BT founder George Srour included in 2012 Forbes 30 under 30 list for Social Entrepreneurs
- BT recognized by the Waldzell Institute of Austria
