= Benjamin Timbrell =

English architect

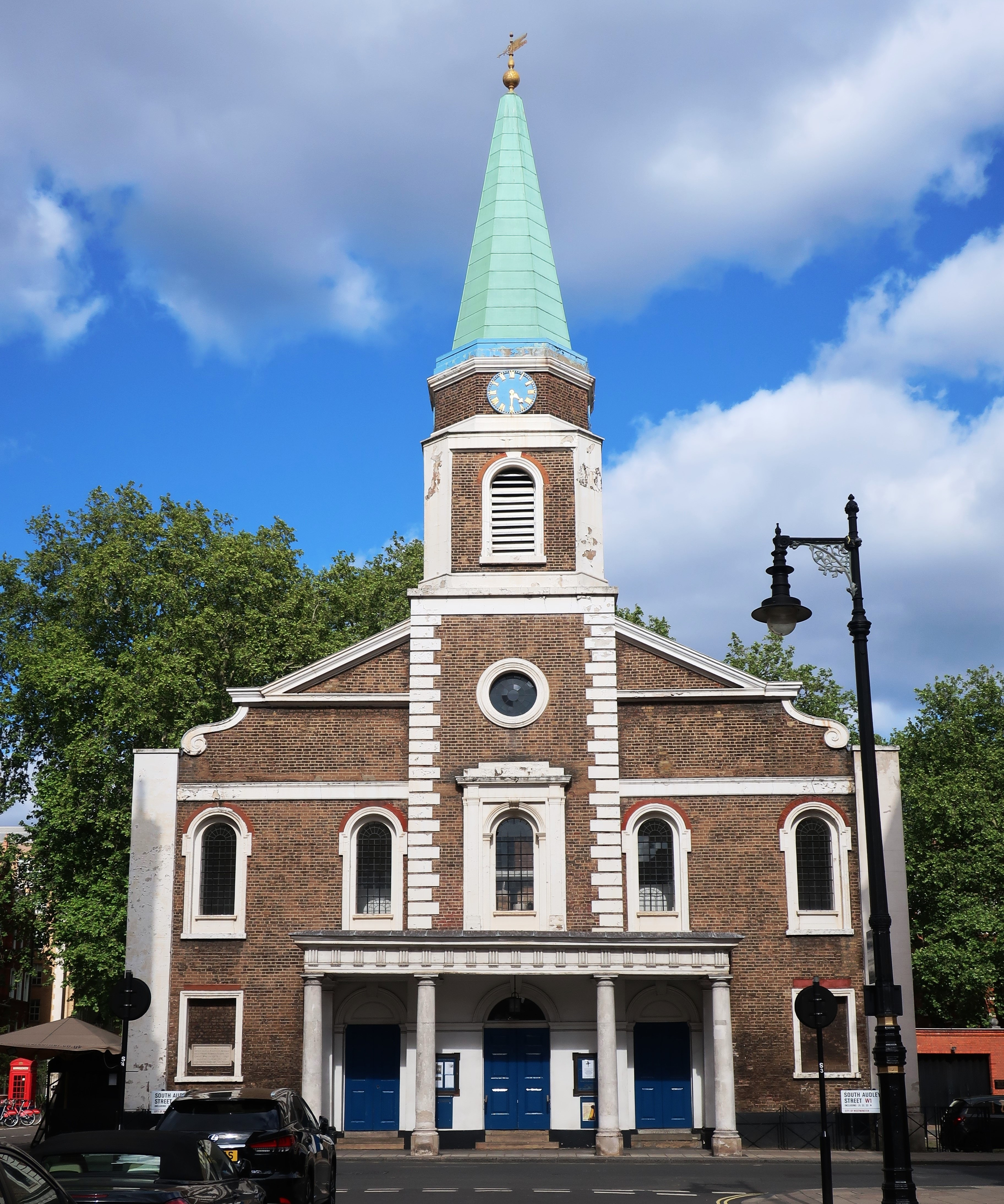
Grosvenor Chapel, 2020

Benjamin Timbrell (c. 1683–1754) was an English master builder and architect, active in the West End of London in the first half of the eighteenth century.

He was the architect of the Grosvenor Chapel on South Audley Street in London's Mayfair district.
